= Chronological summary of the 2026 Asian Games =

This is a chronological summary of the major events of the 2026 Asian Games around Aichi Prefecture in Japan. Competition began on 10 September with the first matches in men's basketball. The opening ceremony was held nine days later on 19 September. The last day of competition was the equestrian and the closing ceremony were held on 4 October. The games featured 59 disciplines.

== Calendar ==
Competition began nine days before the opening ceremony on 10 September and ended on 4 October 2026.

OC	Opening ceremony	●	Event competitions	●	Event finals	CC	Closing ceremony

September/October 2026		September																					October				Events
September/October 2026		10 Thu	11 Fri	12 Sat	13 Sun	14 Mon	15 Tue	16 Wed	17 Thu	18 Fri	19 Sat	20 Sun	21 Mon	22 Tue	23 Wed	24 Thu	25 Fri	26 Sat	27 Sun	28 Mon	29 Tue	30 Wed	1 Thu	2 Fri	3 Sat	4 Sun	Events
Ceremonies											OC															CC	—N/a
Aquatics
Aquatics	Artistic swimming																	●	1	1							2
Aquatics	Diving																	2	2	2	2	2					10
Aquatics	Swimming											7	7	6	7	7	7										41
Aquatics	Water polo											●	●	●	●	1		●	●	●	●	●		●	1		2
Archery																		●	●	●	●	3	2	3	2		10
Athletics															2	4	7	7	11	10	9						50
Badminton												●	●	●	●	2	●	●	●	●	5						7
Baseball
Baseball	Baseball												●	●	●		●	●	1								1
Baseball	Softball																	●	●	●	●	●	●	●	1		1
Basketball
Basketball	Basketball	●	●	●	●	●		●	●	●	●	1	●	●		●	●	1									2
Basketball	3x3 basketball												●	●	●	●	2										2
Boxing													●	●	●	●	●	●	●	●	●	●		11			11
Breaking																								●	2		2
Canoeing
Canoeing	Slalom																				●	2	2	2			6
Canoeing	Sprint														●	4	4	4									12
Combat sports
Combat sports	Ju-jitsu																						3	3	2		8
Combat sports	Kurash																		2	2	2						6
Combat sports	Mixed martial arts											●	●	6													6
Cricket									●	●		●		1		●	●	●		●	●		●		1		2
Cycling
Cycling	BMX																		2	2							4
Cycling	Mountain biking															1	1										2
Cycling	Road cycling											2		1	1												4
Cycling	Track cycling																				2	3	3	4			12
Equestrian														●	2		1	●	1				1		●	2	7
Esports														●	2	1	●	2	1	1	1	1	1	1			11
Fencing														2	2	2	2	2	2								12
Field hockey										●		●	●	●	●	●	●	●	●	●		●	●	1	1		2
Football						●	●	●	●	●		●	●	●	●		●	●			●	●		1	1		2
Golf																						●	●	●	4		4
Gymnastics
Gymnastics	Artistic												1	1	2	5	5										14
Gymnastics	Rhythmic																						●	●	2		2
Gymnastics	Trampolining																		2								2
Handball											●	●	●	●	●		●	●	1	●	1						2
Judo																						4	5	5	1		15
Kabaddi													●	●	●	●	●	2									2
Karate												4	4	4	3												15
Modern pentathlon								●	●	●		4															4
Padel																				●	●	●	●	●	2		2
Rowing															●	14											14
Rugby sevens																							●	●	2		2
Sailing																		●	●	●	●	●	2	7	5		14
Sepak takraw												●	●	●	●	●	2		●	●	2	●	●	●	2		6
Shooting												2	2	1	6	3	3	2	●	2	4	1	2				28
Skateboarding																●	2	●	2								4
Sport climbing																					●	2	2	●	2		6
Squash															●	●	●	●	3	●	●	●	●	2			5
Surfing																	●	●	●	2							2
Table tennis												●	●	●	●	2	●	1	2	2							7
Taekwondo
Taekwondo	Taekwondo																						2	4	4		10
Taekwondo	Virtual taekwondo																							1			1
Tennis
Tennis	Tennis																		●	●	●	●	●	2	3		5
Tennis	Soft tennis									●		2	1	●	2												5
Teqball									●	●	●	5															5
Triathlon												2	1														3
Volleyball
Volleyball	Beach volleyball											●	●	●	●	●	●	●	●	●	●	●	●	1	1		2
Volleyball	Indoor volleyball							●	●	●		●	●	1					●	●	●		●	●	1		2
Weightlifting															2	2	2	2	2	2	4						16
Wrestling																						4	4	5	5		18
Wushu												2	2	2	2	7											15
Daily medal events		0	0	0	0	0	0	0	0	0	0	31	18	25	33	56	39	25	33	26	32	22	29	51	47	2	469
Cumulative total		0	0	0	0	0	0	0	0	0	0	31	49	74	107	163	202	227	260	286	318	340	369	420	467	469	469
September/October 2026		September																					October				Events
September/October 2026		10 Thu	11 Fri	12 Sat	13 Sun	14 Mon	15 Tue	16 Wed	17 Thu	18 Fri	19 Sat	20 Sun	21 Mon	22 Tue	23 Wed	24 Thu	25 Fri	26 Sat	27 Sun	28 Mon	29 Tue	30 Wed	1 Thu	2 Fri	3 Sat	4 Sun	Events

Source: Aichi-Nagoya 2026

== Medal table ==
By default, the table is ordered by the number of gold medals the athletes from a member have won, where a member is an entity represented by a NOC. The number of silver medals is taken into consideration next and then the number of bronze medals. If teams are still tied, equal ranking is given and they are listed alphabetically by their IOC country code.

* Host nation (Japan)

2026 Asian Games medal table
Rank	Nation	Gold	Silver	Bronze	Total
1	China	169	86	80	335
2	Japan*	78	96	87	261
3	South Korea	38	37	66	141
4	Uzbekistan	21	24	24	69
5	India	20	27	37	84
6	Iran	18	18	15	51
7	Thailand	18	11	18	47
8	Kazakhstan	11	23	43	77
9	Hong Kong	11	15	24	50
10	Bahrain	10	5	6	21
11	Malaysia	8	7	12	27
12	North Korea	6	12	9	27
13	Qatar	6	6	6	18
14	United Arab Emirates	5	5	0	10
15	Chinese Taipei	4	18	31	53
16	Philippines	4	10	14	28
17	Kuwait	4	1	4	9
18	Indonesia	3	10	24	37
19	Vietnam	3	3	18	24
20	Saudi Arabia	3	2	8	13
21	Singapore	2	10	4	16
22	Tajikistan	2	5	8	15
23	Jordan	2	2	6	10
24	Myanmar	2	1	2	5
25	Macau	1	4	2	7
26	Kyrgyzstan	1	2	10	13
27	Mongolia	1	1	12	14
28	Sri Lanka	1	1	1	3
29	Pakistan	0	2	8	10
30	Iraq	0	2	3	5
31	Turkmenistan	0	2	0	2
32	Afghanistan	0	1	2	3
32	Lebanon	0	1	2	3
34	Oman	0	1	1	2
35	Cambodia	0	0	4	4
36	Bangladesh	0	0	1	1
36	Laos	0	0	1	1
36	Nepal	0	0	1	1
Totals (38 entries)		452	451	594	1,497

== Day-by-day summaries ==
=== 10–19 September ===
- Men's basketball - Up to semi-finals

=== 14–18 September ===
- Football at the 2026 Asian Games – Men's tournament - Some group games
- Football at the 2026 Asian Games – Women's tournament - Some group games

=== 16–18 September ===
- Men's and Women's modern pentathelon - Up to semi-finals
- Women's volleyball - Group stage

=== 17–18 September ===
- Women's cricket - Quarter-finals

=== 17–19 September ===
- Teqball - Up to semi-finals

=== 18 September ===
- Men's and Women's soft tennis - Up to quarter finals
- Men's and Women's field hockey - First group games

=== 19 September ===
- Men's and Women's handball - First group games
- Opening ceremony

=== Day 1: 20 September ===
At the end of the first day, China led the medals tally with 11 golds and 21 other teams also go onto the podium. One world record was broken and 5 Asian Games' record.

Sport	Event	Gold medalists			Silver medalists		Bronze medalists		Ref
Sport	Event	Competitors	Team	Rec	Competitors	Team	Competitors	Team	Ref
Basketball	Men's		South Korea			Japan		Iran	
Cycling	Women's Individual Time Trial	Rinata Sultanova	Kazakhstan		Hao Zhang	China	Jieun Shin	South Korea	
Cycling	Men's Individual Time Trial	Alexey Lutsenko	Kazakhstan		Shunsuke Imamura	Japan	Jambaljamts Sainbayar	Mongolia	
Karate	Women's individual kata	Maho Ono	Japan		Mo Sheung Grace Lau	Hong Kong	Hui-hsuan Chien; Ngoc Nhi Bui	Chinese Taipei; Vietnam	
Karate	Men's kumite ~55kg	Zholaman Bigabyl	Kazakhstan		Khumoyunmirzo Khalimov	Uzbekistan	Thevendran Kaliana Sundram; Makhsatullo Muminov	Malaysia; Tajikistan	
Karate	Men's kumite ~60kg	Abdullah Shaaban	Kuwait		Abdelrahman Abdelhamid	Qatar	Saud Abdulaziz Albashar B Sureeya Sankar Hari Sankar	Saudi Arabia; Malaysia	
Karate	Women's kumite +68kg	Sofya Berultseva	Kazakhstan		Maneevan Butsuwan	Thailand	Leica Al Humaira Lubis; Dina Ahmed Mostafa S	Indonesia; Saudi Arabia	
Modern pentathlon	Women's individual	Seungmin Seong	South Korea		Zhang Mingyu	China	Wu Xiyao	China	
Modern pentathlon	Women's team		China			South Korea		Japan	
Modern pentathlon	Men's individual	Liuchang Li	China		Woongtae Jun	South Korea	Jonghyeon Lee	South Korea	
Modern pentathlon	Men's team		South Korea			China		Kazakhstan	
Shooting	Women's 10m Air Rifle team	Zifei Wang; Yuchen Du	China	WR	Elavenil Valarivan; Vidarsa Kochalumkal Vinod	India	Hinata Taichi; Misaki Nobata	Japan	
Shooting	Women's 10m Air Rifle individual	Hinata Taichi	Japan	GR	Elavenil Valarivan	India	Hyojin Ban	South Korea	
Soft tennis	Men's team		Japan			Chinese Taipei		Indonesia; South Korea	
Soft tennis	Women's team	Kiho Miyamae; Rio Maeda	Japan		Yan-zhen Zhou; Min-yu Chiang	Chinese Taipei		Philippines; South Korea	
Swimming	Women's 200m Butterfly	Zidi Yu	China	GR	Mohan Chang	China	Misa Okuzono	Japan	
Swimming	Men's 200m Individual Medley	Tomoyuki Matsushita	Japan		Yumeki Kojima	Japan	Shun Wang	China	
Swimming	Women's 1500m Freestyle	Bingjie Li	China		Ching Hwee Gan	Singapore	Ichika Kajimoto	Japan	
Swimming	Men's 100m Freestyle	Zhanle Pan	China		Youngbeom Kim	South Korea	Sunwoo Hwang	South Korea	
Swimming	Women's 50m Breaststroke	Qianting Tang	China	GR	Satomi Suzuki	Japan	Chang Yang	China	
Swimming	Men's 100m Backstroke	Jiayu Xu	China	GR	Hidekazu Takehara	Japan	Juho Lee	South Korea	
Swimming	Women's 4 x 100m Freestyle Relay		China	GR		Hong Kong		Japan	
Teqball	Women's doubles	Jutatip Kuntatong; Suphawadi Wongkhamchan	Thailand		Aung Hsu Mon; Than Phyu Phyu	Myanmar	Maria Chedid; Kamar Dandal; Sophornraksamey Yorn; Sreymeas Mey	Lebanon; Cambodia	
Teqball	Men's singles	Junsuk Lee	South Korea		Ali Jalil Mezher Alelayawi	Iraq	Friday Saw; Yoga Ardika Putra	Myanmar; Indonesia	
Teqball	Men's doubles	Sorrasak Thaosiri; Jirati Chanliang	Thailand		Ahmad Kassem Arabi; Mohamad Hafez	Lebanon	Basel Ahmad; Abdulwahab AlqattanAbdulrahman Ahmed Radhi Radhi; Ali Jalil Mezher Alelayawi	Kuwait; Iraq	
Teqball	Women's singles	Wai Khin Hnin	Myanmar		Sumaya	Indonesia	Yuina Sakamoto; Koemyean DY	Japan; Cambodia	
Teqball	Mixed doubles	Phakpong Dejaroen; Suphawadi Wongkhamchan	Thailand		Yuina Sakamoto; Akinori Wase	Japan	Hoang Minh Tan Nguyen; Gia Nghi Trinh; Abdulrahman Ahmed Radhi Radhi; Samah Shakir Abed Abed	Vietnam; Iraq	
Triathlon	Men's individual	Takumi Hojo	Japan		Xirui Zhang	China	Arlan Zhanabay	Kazakhstan	
Triathlon	Women's individual	Xinyu Lin	China		Anqi Huang	China	Manami Hayashi	Japan	
Wushu	Men's changquan	Chi Hin Kuong	Macau		Chi Kuan Song	Macau	Seraf Naro Siregar	Indonesia	
Wushu	Women's Taijiquan & Taijijian	Xin Tong	China		Shiho Saito	Japan	Zeanne Zhi Ning Law	Singapore	

=== Day 2: 21 September ===
At the end of the second day, China maintained its stand at the top of the medal table, while two teams were added to the table. One world record was broken, three Asian records and two Asian Games records.

Sport	Event	Gold medalists			Silver medalists		Bronze medalists		Ref
Sport	Event	Competitors	Team	Rec	Competitors	Team	Competitors	Team	Ref
Gymnastics	Men's individual all-around	Boheng Zhang	China		Shinnosuke Oka	Japan	Daiki Hashimoto	Japan	
Karate	Men's individual kata	Kakeru Nishiyama	Japan		Man Hou Fong	Macau	Ho Wai Howard Hung; Sayed Mohammed Almosawi	Hong Kong; Kuwait	
Karate	Men's kumite ~67kg	Abdul Vakhkhob Rashidov	Uzbekistan		Yugo Kozaki	Japan	Cheng-chung Shih; Abdel Rahman Almasatfa	Chinese Taipei; Jordan	
Karate	Women's kumite ~61kg	Li Gong	China		Assel Kanay	Kazakhstan	Sarara Shimada; Chakriya Vann	Japan; Cambodia	
Karate	Women's kumite ~68kg	Qiaoqiao Li	China		Joud Aldrous	Jordan	Cheuk Lee Wong	Hong Kong	
Shooting	Men's 10m Air Rifle team		China	WR		India		South Korea	
Shooting	Men's 10m Air Rifle individual	Lihao Sheng	China	AR	Himanshu Dhillon	India	Rudrankksh Balasaheb Patil	India	
Soft tennis	Mixed doubles	Kai-wen Yu; Shih-yuan Huang	Chinese Taipei		Toshiki Uematsu; Rena Temma	Japan	Yeon-hwa Kim; Jaekyu Park; Kaito Maruyama; Shih-yuan Huang	South Korea; Japan	
Swimming	Men's 50m Backstroke	Jiayu Xu	China	GR	Zicheng Wang	China	Jihwan Yoon	South Korea	
Swimming	Women's 50m Backstroke	Letian Wan	China		Xueer Wang	China	Seungwon Kim	South Korea	
Swimming	Men's 50m Freestyle	Youngbeom Kim	South Korea	GR	Ian Yentou Ho	Hong Kong	Yuchan Ji	South Korea	
Swimming	Women's 200m Freestyle	Siobhan Haughey	Hong Kong		Jiaping Li	China	Yaxin Liu	China	
Swimming	Men's 100m Breaststroke	Zhihao Dong	China		Shin Ohashi	Japan	Haiyang Qin	China	
Swimming	Women's 200m Individual Medley	Zidi Yu	China	AR	Yiting Yu	China	Mio Narita	Japan	
Swimming	Men's 4 x 200m Freestyle Relay		China	AR		Japan		South Korea	
Triathlon	Mixed relay		China			Japan		Hong Kong	
Wushu	Women's Changquan	Hui Yu Lydia Sham	Hong Kong		Cho Man Sou	Macau	Eugenia Diva Widodo	Indonesia	
Wushu	Men's Taijiquan & Taijijian	Dewen Liu	China						

=== Day 3: 22 September ===
At the end of the third day, China maintained its stand at the top of the medal table, while eight teams were added to the table. One world record was broken, one Asian record and one Asian Games record.

Sport	Event	Gold medalists			Silver medalists		Bronze medalists		Ref
Sport	Event	Competitors	Team	Rec	Competitors	Team	Competitors	Team	Ref
Cricket	Women's		India			Sri Lanka		Pakistan	
Road cycling	Women's Road Race	Li Guo	China		Fariba Hashimi	Afghanistan	Wing Yee Leung	Hong Kong	
Fencing	Men's Foil Individual	Kazuki Iimura	Japan		Chun Yin Ryan Choi	Hong Kong	Kyosuke Matsuyama; Jeonghyun Youn	Japan; South Korea	
Fencing	Women's Épée Individual	Sera Song	South Korea		Tikanah Abdul Rahman Kiria	Singapore	Tamaki Terayama; Jingwen Yang	Japan; China	
Gymnastics	Women's individual all-around	Aiko Sugihara	Japan		Qinqin Ke	China	Misa Nishiyama	Japan	
Mixed martial arts	Men's Modern -60kg	Mirzobek Umarov	Tajikistan		Firdavs Atamuratov	Uzbekistan	Dastan Kanybek Uulu; Asim Khan	Kyrgyzstan; Pakistan**	
Mixed martial arts	Men's Modern -71kg	Kadyrbek Shinbayev	Kazakhstan		Behruz Khurshedzoda	Tajikistan	Yryskeldi Duisheev; Nodirbek Shavkatov	Kyrgyzstan; Uzbekistan**	
Mixed martial arts	Women's Modern -54kg	Kanjutha Phattaraboonsorn	Thailand		Diana Pogosian	Armenia	Bomi Lee; Vallensia Fahira Hotmauli	South Korea; Indonesia**	
Mixed martial arts	Men's Traditional -65kg	Otabek Rajabov	Tajikistan		Jean Claude Saclag	Philippines	Sanzhar Adilov; Daisuke Murayama	Kazakhstan; Japan**	
Mixed martial arts	Women's Traditional -60kg	Hui Hoon Teo	Singapore		Khiola Sobirova	Uzbekistan	Dalin Cheng; Suchika Tariyal	Cambodia; India**	
Mixed martial arts	Men's Traditional -77kg	Yerkingali Burkutalin	Kazakhstan		Mukhammad Nabiev	Bahrain	Carlos Alvarez; Syimyk Zhanybek Uulu	Philippines; Kyrgyzstan**	
Karate	Women's Team Kata		Vietnam			Iran		Philippines; Chinese Taipei	
Karate	Men's Kumite -84kg	Mohammad Alja'fri	Jordan		Ali Asghar Asiabari	Iran	Abdulla Babikr	Qatar	
Karate	Women's Kumite -55kg	Adeola Fay Robert	Malaysia		Fatemehzahra Saeidabadi	Iran		Indonesia	
Karate	Men's Kumite -75kg	Morteza Nemati	Iran		Davut Nazmyradov	Turkmenistan		Kazakhstan; Syria	
Shooting	10m Air Rifle Mixed Team		China	WR		South Korea		Japan	
Swimming	Women's 100m Freestyle	Siobhan Haughey	Hong Kong		Yiting Yu	China	Yujie Cheng	China	
Swimming	Men's 400m Individual Medley	Yumeki Kojima	Japan	GR	Tomoyuki Matsushita	Japan	Shun Wang	China	
Swimming	Women's 200m Backstroke	Xuwei Peng	China	AR	Mingxia Sun	China	Rio Shirai	Japan	
Swimming	Men's 1500m Freestyle	Zhanshuo Zhang	China		Kaito Tabuchi	Japan	Kazushi Imafuku	Japan	
Swimming	Women's 400m Freestyle	Bingjie Li	China		Ching Hwee Gan	Singapore	Ichika Kajimoto	Japan	
Swimming	Men's 4 x 100m Medley Relay		China			Japan		South Korea	
Volleyball	Women's		China			Japan		Thailand	
Wushu	Men's Nanquan & Nangun	Jianming Li	China		Wen-sheng Huang	Chinese Taipei	Chi Lung Lau	Hong Kong	
Wushu	Women's Nanquan & Nandao	Yaling Zhang	China		Darya Latisheva	Uzbekistan	Sam In Wong	Macau	

=== Day 4: 23 September ===
At the end of the fourth day, China maintained its stand at the top of the medal table, while two teams were added to the table. One world record was tied, three Asian records and four Asian Games records were broken.

Sport	Event	Gold medalists			Silver medalists		Bronze medalists		Ref
Sport	Event	Competitors	Team	Rec	Competitors	Team	Competitors	Team	Ref
Athletics	Men's Half Marathon Race Walk	Shengji Shi	China		Toshikazu Yamanishi	Japan	Byeongkwang Choe	South Korea	
Athletics	Women's Half Marathon Race Walk	Liujing Yang	China		Kristina Morozova	Kazakhstan	Yunyan Jiang	China	
Road cycling	Men's Road Race	Alexey Lutsenko	Kazakhstan		Yevgeniy Federov	Kazakhstan	Yuhi Todome	Japan	
Equestrian	Eventing Team - Cross country		Thailand			Japan		South Korea	
Equestrian	Eventing Individual - Cross country	Tian Hua on Manjushri	China		Woraphat Sittiju on Uster de Chanay	Thailand	Yoshiaki Oiwa on Ottawa des desig	Japan	
Esports	Auto Racing [Gran Turismo 7]	Taj Izrin Aiman Taj Madira	Malaysia		Abdulhakim S Alfaleh	Saudi Arabia	Youngchan Kim	South Korea	
Esports	Football [eFootball™]		Iran			Malaysia		Japan; Uzbekistan	
Fencing	Women's Foil Individual	Yuka Ueno	Japan		Jihee Park	South Korea	Polina Volobueva; Maxine Jie Xin Wong	Uzbekistan; Singapore	
Fencing	Men's Sabre Individual	Sanguk Oh	South Korea		Chenpeng Shen	China	Artyom Sarkissyan; Seyed Ali Esmaeilzadeh Pakdaman	Armenia; Iran	
Gymnastics	Men's Team		China			Japan		Chinese Taipei	
Gymnastics	Women's Team		China			Japan		North Korea	
Karate	Men's Team Kata		Kuwait			Macau		Hong Kong; Malaysia	
Karate	Women's Kumite -50kg						Man Wai Fong; Marie June Adriano	Macau; Philippines	
Karate	Men's Kumite +84kg	Mahmoud Nemati	Iran		Sanad Hassan Y Sufyani	Saudi Arabia	Teerawat Kangtong; Tenzing Sherpa	Thailand; Nepal	
Shooting	10m Air Pistol Women Team		China			South Korea		Vietnam	
Shooting	Skeet Men Team		Qatar			Kuwait		India	
Shooting	Skeet Women Team		China	GR		Kazakhstan		India	
Shooting	10m Air Pistol Women Individual	Gaeun Choo	South Korea	AR	Yiyao Shen	China	Ranxin Jiang	China	
Shooting	Skeet Women Individual	Yiting Jiang	China	[E]WR	Isarapa Imprasertsuk	Thailand	Assem Orynbay	Kazakhstan	
Shooting	Skeet Men Individual	AL-ATHBA Rashid Saleh M A al-Athba	Qatar		Jianlin Lyu	China	Meng-Yuan Lee	Chinese Taipei	
Soft tennis	Women's singles	Rena Temma	Japan		Jin Mi Ri	North Korea	So Hyang Ri; Kiho Miyamae	North Korea; Japan	
Soft tennis	Men's singles	Toshiki Uematsu	Japan		Takuya Kurosaka	Japan	Po-yi Chen; Jay Meena	Chinese Taipei; India	
Swimming	Women's 100m Butterfly	Yiting Yu	China		Yufei Zhang	China	Cheuk Tung Natalie Kan	Hong Kong	
Swimming	Men's 100m Butterfly	Shoon Mitsunaga	Japan	GR	Fang Xu	China	Katsuhiro Matsumoto	Japan	
Swimming	Women's 100m Backstroke	Xuwei Peng	China		Rio Shirai	Japan	Seungwon Kim	South Korea	
Swimming	Men's 200m Freestyle	Zhanshuo Zhang	China	AR	Sunwoo Hwang	South Korea	Tatsuya Murasa	Japan	
Swimming	Women's 100m Breaststroke	Qianting Tang	China	GR	Satomi Suzuki	Japan	Kotomi Kato	Japan	
Swimming	Men's 200m Freestyle	Zhanshuo Zhang	China	AR	Sunwoo Hwang	South Korea	Tatsuya Murasa	Japan	
Swimming	Mixed 4 x 100m Medley Relay		China			Japan		South Korea	
Weightlifting	Women's 49kg	Song Gum Ri	North Korea		Mirabai Chanu Saikhom	India	Luluk Diana Tri Wijayana	Indonesia	
Weightlifting	Women's 400m Individual Medley	Zidi Yu	China	GR	Wenxi Ke	China	Mio Narita	Japan	
Wushu	Men's Daoshu & Gunshu	Xiaobin Gao	China		Si Wei Lim	Singapore	Clement Su Wei Ting	Malaysia	
Wushu	Women's Jianshu & Qiangshu	Yang Yao	China		Nanoha Kida	Japan	Thuy Vi Duong	Vietnam	

=== Day 5: 24 September ===
At the end of the fifth day, China maintained its stand at the top of the medal table, while three teams were added to the table. Two world records were broken, one Asian record was beaten, one tied and four Asian Games records were broken.

Sport	Event	Gold medalists			Silver medalists		Bronze medalists		Ref
Sport	Event	Competitors	Team	Rec	Competitors	Team	Competitors	Team	Ref
Athletics	Women's Triple Jump	Sharifa Davronova	Uzbekistan		Yingying Huang	China	Yi Li	China	
Athletics	Men's Discus Throw	Abuduaini Tuergong	China		Nanjun Wu	China	Sadegh Samimishalamzari	Iran	
Athletics	Women's 10,000m	Winfred Yavi	Bahrain		Nozomi Tanaka	Japan	Seema	India	
Athletics	4 x 400m Relay Mixed		Bahrain	GR		India		Vietnam	
Badminton	Women's Team		China			Japan		South Korea**; Indonesia**	
Badminton	Men's Team		China			Indonesia		India**; Thailand**	
Canoeing	Women's Canoe Single 200m	Shohsanam Sherzodova	Uzbekistan		Changwen Shuai	China	Herlin Aprilin Lali	Indonesia	
Canoeing	Men's Kayak Four 500m		South Korea			China		Japan	
Canoeing	Women's Kayak Double 500m	Shimeng Yu; Mengdie Yin	China		Olga Shmelyova; Tatyana Tokarnitskaya	Kazakhstan	Arina Tanatmisheva; Ekaterina Shubina	Uzbekistan	
Canoeing	Men's Canoe Double 500m	Shengyue Wu; Bowen Ji	China		Artur Guliev; Vladlen Denisov	China	Sergey Yemelyov; Timofey Yemelyov	China	
Cycling	Mountain bike - Women's Cross-country	Zhifan Wu	China		Zhenglan Liang	China	Sayu Bella Sukma Dewi	Indonesia	
Esports	Action-adventure / Battle Royale [Naraka : Bladepoint] -		China				Thailand	Chinese Taipei; Vietnam	
Fencing	Men's Épée Individual	Koki Kano	Japan		Kirill Prokhodov	Kazakhstan	Hoi Sun Fong; Masaru Yamada	Hong Kong | Japan	
Fencing	Women's Sabre Individual	Misaki Emura	Japan		Zaynab Dayibekova	Uzbekistan	Qimiao Pan; Xueyi Rao	China | China	
Gymnastics	Men's Floor Exercise	Carlos Edriel Yulo	Philippines		Milad Karimi	Kazakhstan	Shoma Tsukiyama	Japan	
Gymnastics	Women's Vault	Seojeong Yeo	South Korea		Chang Ok An	North Korea	Siyu Du	China	
Gymnastics	Men's Pommel Horse	Utkirbek Juraev	Uzbekistan		Arman Khodaei Valehzaghard	Iran	Daiki Hashimoto	Japan	
Gymnastics	Women's Uneven Bars	Qiyuan Qiu	China		Misa Nishiyama	Japan	Qingying Zhang	China	
Gymnastics	Men's Rings	Xingyu Lan	China		Kiichi Kaneta	Japan	Jingyuan Zou	China	
Rowing	Men's Single Sculls	Zhiwei Deng	China		Shakhboz Kholmurzaev	Uzbekistan	Tatsuya Sakurama	Japan	
Rowing	Men's Double Sculls	Xudi Yi; Vide Nie	China		Mekhrojbek Mamatkulov; Pavel Sorin	Uzbekistan	Satnam Singh; Salman Khan	India	
Rowing	Lightweight Women's Single Sculls	Fatemeh Mojallaltopraghghale	Iran		Wing Yan Winne Hung	Hong Kong	Parisa Chaempudsa	Thailand	
Rowing	Lightweight Women's Double Sculls	Kimia Zarei; Zeinab Norouzi Tazeh Kand	Iran		Yuen Shan Cheung; Wing Wun Leung	Hong Kong	Chika Yonezawa; Chiaki Tomita	Japan	
Rowing	Men's Pair	Vladislav Yakovlev; Ivan Chernukhin	Kazakhstan		Chuang Cao; Mengshuai Yang	China	Maksim Golubev; Alisher Turdiev	Uzbekistan	
Rowing	Women's Four		China			Uzbekistan		Vietnam	
Rowing	Women's Quadruple Sculls		China			Iran		Japan	
Rowing	Women's Single Sculls	Xinyu Zhang	China		Anna Prakaten	Uzbekistan	Fatemeh Mojallaltopraghghale	Iran	
Rowing	Women's Double Sculls	Sixuan Wang; Shuangmei Shen	China		Kimia Zarei; Zeinab Norouzi Tazeh Kand	Iran	Thi Tu Uyen Tran; Thi Bich Ngoc Pham	Vietnam	
Rowing	Lightweight Men's Single Sculls	Hin Chun Chiu	Hong Kong		Amirhossein Mahmoodpour Shahrestani	Iran	Hyunsu Park	South Korea	
Rowing	Lightweight Men's Double Sculls	Shakhzod Nurmatov; Sobirjon Safaroliyev	Uzbekistan		Rafiq Wijdan Yasir; Ali Mardiansyah	Indonesia	LAM San Tung Lam; Tik Lun Chan	Hong Kong	
Rowing	Women's Pair	Wanning Ren; Hongshan Zhu	China		Anna Aksenova; Aydana Smetullaeva	Uzbekistan	Thi Hao Dinh; Thi Hue Pham	Vietnam	
Rowing	Men's Quadruple Sculls		China			Indonesia		Uzbekistan	
Rowing	Men's Four		China			Uzbekistan		Vietnam	
Shooting	10m Air Pistol Men Team		China			Indonesia		Japan	
Shooting	Skeet Mixed Team		China	WR		South Korea		India	
Shooting	10m Air Pistol Men Individual	Vladimir Svechnikov	Uzbekistan	GR	Kai Hu	China	Shuaihang Bu	China	
Swimming	Women's 50m Freestyle	Qingfeng Wu	China	GR	Siobhan Haughey	Hong Kong	Yujie Cheng	China	
Swimming	Men's 50m Butterfly	Mikhail Arkhangelskiy	Bahrain	=AR	Shoon Mitsunaga	Japan	Changhao Wang	China	
Swimming	Women's 200m Breaststroke	Kotomi Kato	Japan		Sieun Park	South Korea	Leiju Zhu	China	
Swimming	Men's 200m Breaststroke	Shin Ohashi	Japan	WR	Denis Petrashov	Kyrgyzstan	Sung Jae Cho	South Korea	
Swimming	Men's 800m Freestyle	Zhanshuo Zhang	China	GR	Kaito Tabuchi	Japan	Junwoo Kim	South Korea	
Swimming	Men's 4 x 100m Freestyle Relay		China	AR		South Korea		Japan	
Swimming	Women's 4 x 200m Freestyle Relay		China			Japan		South Korea	
Water polo	Women's		China			Japan			
Table tennis	Women's Team		China			Japan		North Korea**; South Korea**	
Table tennis	Men's Team		Japan				China	Chinese Taipei**; South Korea**	
Weightlifting	Men's 60kg	Yang Yang	China		Un Chol Pang	North Korea	Theerapong Silachai	Thailand	
Weightlifting	Men's 65kg	Myong Jin Pak	North Korea		Yueji He	China	Minh Tri Tran	Vietnam	
Wushu	Women's 52kg	Di Wu	China		Sogand Sinkaeichetan	Iran	Jinnat Akter***; Tsz Ching Chan	Bangladesh**; Hong Kong**	
Wushu	Women's 60kg	Xiaoyu Zhang	China		Roshibina Devi Naorem	India	Thi Thu Thuy Nguyen***; Thania Kusumaningtyas	Vietnam**; Indonesia**	
Wushu	Men's 56kg	Jiaming Ou	China		Van Tam Dinh	Vietnam	ABDURASHITOV Saydullo Abdurashitov; Fereddy Sinaga	Uzbekistan**; Indonesia**	
Wushu	Men's 60kg	Sishuo Tang***	China		Yu Hong Leung	China	Bintang Reindra Nada Guitara; Van Doan Hua***	Indonesia**; Vietnam**	
Wushu	Men's 65kg	Chengjin Wang	China		Shoja Panahigelekolaei	Iran	Khac Kien Nguyen; Hamid Ashrafi***	Vietnam**; Afghanistan**	
Wushu	Men's 70kg	Shuo Ma	China		Erfan Moharrami Piraghom	Iran	Mohammad Khalid Hotak***; ABLAGATOV Alizhan Ablagatov***	Afghanistan**; Kazakhstan**	
Wushu	Men's 75kg	Soheil Mousavi***	Iran		Abdurashid Abdullayev	Kazakhstan	Doniyor Turgunbaev***; Huan-yi Zhang****	Uzbekistan**; Chinese Taipei**	

=== Day 6: 25 September ===
At the end of the sixth day, China maintained its stand at the top of the medal table. One Asian record was beaten and five Asian Games records were broken.

Sport	Event	Gold medalists			Silver medalists		Bronze medalists		Ref
Sport	Event	Competitors	Team	Rec	Competitors	Team	Competitors	Team	Ref
Athletics	Women's Shot Put	Jiayuan Song	China		Linru Zhang	China	Manpreet Kaur	India	
Athletics	Women's Pole Vault	Misaki Morota	Japan		Chunge Niu	China	Baranica Elangovan	India	
Athletics	Women's Heptathlon	Yuri Tanaka	Japan		Nanaka Kajiki	Japan	Alina Chistyakova	Kazakhstan	
Athletics	Men's 10,000m	Birhanu Balew	Bahrain		Gulveer Singh	India	Albert Kiptoo	Bahrain	
Athletics	Men's Hammer Throw	Sukhrob Krodjaev	Uzbekistan		Shota Fukuda	Japan	Mohammed Aldubaisi	Saudi Arabia	
Athletics	Women's 100m	Yujie Chen	China	GR	Shanti Pereira	Singapore	Edidiong Odiong	Bahrain	
Athletics	Men's 100m	Puripol Boomson	Thailand	GR	Ali Al Balushi	Oman	Malham Al Balushi	Oman	
Basketball 3x3	Women's		Japan			Philippines		South Korea	
Basketball 3x3	Men's		South Korea			Qatar		Iran	
Canoeing	Men's Kayak Double 500m	Gwang Hee Cho; Hyobin Kim	South Korea		Taishi Tanada; Masaya Tanaka	Japan	Ali Aghamirzaeijenaghard; Peyman Ghavidel Siah Sofiani	Iran	
Canoeing	Women's Kayak Four 500m		China			Uzbekistan		Kazakhstan	
Canoeing	Men's Canoe Single 500m -	Bowen Ji	China		Vladlen Denisov	Uzbekistan	Kuan-chieh Lai	Chinese Taipei	
Canoeing	Women's Canoe Double 500m	Mengya Sun; Yanan Ma	China		Shohsanam Sherzodova; Nilufar Zokirova	Uzbekistan	Thi Huong Nguyen; Thi Huong Diep	Vietnam	
Cycling	Men's Mountain Bike - Cross-country	Jinwei Yuan	China		Tatsuumi Soejima	Japan	Feri Yudoyono	Indonesia	
Equestrian	Dressage Team		China			South Korea		Japan	
Fencing	Men's Foil Team		Japan			Hong Kong		China; South Korea	
Fencing	Women's Épée Team		China			South Korea		Singapore; Kazakhstan	
Gymnastics	Men's Vault	Carlos Edriel Yulo	Philippines		Mahdi Olfati	Iran	Ka Ki Ng	Hong Kong	
Gymnastics	Women's Balance Beam	Seohyun Hwang	South Korea		Qiyuan Qiu	China	Mana Okamura	Japan	
Gymnastics	Men's Parallel Bars	Jingyuan Zou	China		Shinnosuke Oka	Japan	Rasuljon Abdurakhimov	Uzbekistan	
Gymnastics	Women's Floor Exercise	Aiko Sugihara	Japan		Misa Nishiyama	Japan	Yihan Zhang	China	
Gymnastics	Men's Horizontal Bar	Hao Tian	China		Shinnosuke Oka	Japan	Karl Jahrel Eldrew Yulo	Philippines	
Sepak takraw	Men's Team Regu		Malaysia			Thailand		Japan; Indonesia	
Sepak takraw	Women's Team Regu		Thailand			South Korea		Indonesia	
Shooting	50m Rifle 3 Positions Men Team		China			India		South Korea	
Shooting	10m Air Pistol Mixed Team		India	AR		South Korea		Iran	
Shooting	50m Rifle 3 Positions Men Individual	Yukun Liu	China	GR	Changhong Zhang	China	Islam Satpayev	Kazakhstan	
Skateboarding	Women's Park	Mizuho Hasegawa	Japan		Yi-fan Lin	Chinese Taipei	Misugu Okamoto	Japan	
Skateboarding	Men's Park	Izuru Nagahara	Japan		Yong-yan Ku	Chinese Taipei	Gunjo Shiji	Japan	
Swimming	Women's 50m Butterfly	Yufei Zhang	China		Qingfeng Wu	China	Rikako Ikee	Japan	
Swimming	Men's 50m Breaststroke	Haiyang Qin	China		Junjie Liu	China	Shin Ohashi	Japan	
Swimming	Women's 800m Freestyle	Bingjie Li	China		Ching Hwee Gan	Singapore	Ichika Kajimoto	Japan	
Swimming	Men's 200m Backstroke	Kodai Nishiono	Japan		Juho Lee	South Korea	Jiayu Xu	China	
Swimming	Men's 400m Freestyle	Zhanshuo Zhang	China	GR	Kazushi Imafuku	Japan	Liwei Fei	China	
Swimming	Men's 200m Butterfly	Kuan-hung Wang	Chinese Taipei		Fang Xu	China	Minseop Kim	South Korea	
Swimming	Women's 4 x 100m Medley Relay		China	GR		Japan		South Korea	
Weightlifting	Women's 57kg	Kwang Ok Oh	North Korea		Suratwadee Yodsarn	Thailand	Guan-ling Chen	Chinese Taipei	
Weightlifting	Women's 61kg	Liuyue Yang	China		Jin Hae Pak	North Korea	Hsing-chun Kuo	Chinese Taipei	

=== Day 7: 26 September ===
At the end of the seventh day, China maintained its stand at the top of the medal table, while two teams were added to the table. One Asian record was beaten and one tied while four Asian Games records were broken.

Sport	Event	Gold medalists			Silver medalists		Bronze medalists		Ref
Sport	Event	Competitors	Team	Rec	Competitors	Team	Competitors	Team	Ref
Athletics	Men's Marathon	Ichitaka Yamashita	Japan		Sawan Barwal	India	Peiyou Peng	China	
Athletics	Women's Marathon	Shitaye Habte	Bahrain		Cirencuomu	China	Mikuni Yada	Japan	
Athletics	Men's Shot Put	Mohammadreza Tayebise	Iran	GR	Tajinderpal Singh Toor	India	Mohammed Tolu	Saudi Arabia	
Athletics	Men's Triple Jump	Wen Su	China	GR	Manato Miyao	Japan	Yinglong Ma	China	
Athletics	Women's 400m	Salwa Naser	Bahrain	GR	Zahra Zarei Manoujan	Iran	Prachi	India	
Athletics	Men's 400m	Joshua Atkinson	Thailand		Suleiman Abdulrahman	United Arab Emirates	Yuki Joseph Nakajima	Japan	
Athletics	Women's 1500m	Nelly Korir	Bahrain	GR	Chunhu Li	China	Nozomi Tanaka	Japan	
Basketball	Women's		South Korea			Japan		China	
Canoeing	Women's Kayak Single 500m	Nan Wang	China		Arina Tanatmisheva	Uzbekistan	Stella Sukhanova	Kazakhstan	
Canoeing	Men's Kayak Single 500m	Shakhriyor Makhkamov	Uzbekistan		Sangwon Jang	South Korea	Dmitriy Kholmogorov	Kazakhstan	
Canoeing	Mixed Canoe Double 500m	Shengyue Wu (M); Yanan Ma (F)	China		Vladlen Denisov (M); Nilufar Zokirova (F)	Uzbekistan	Sergey Yemelyanov (M); Rufina Iskakova (F)	Kazakhstan	
Canoeing	Mixed Kayak Double 500m	LI Chenhao Li (M); Luxi Zhang(F)	China		Minkyu Choi (M); Minju Seon (F)	South Korea	Rin Fukuda (F); Akihiro Inoue (M)	Japan	
Diving	Women's Synchronised 10m Platform	Yuxi Chen; Wei Lu	China		Jin Mi Jo; Mi Rae Kim	North Korea	Nahyun Kim; Nayun Moon	South Korea	
Diving	Men's Synchronised 3m Springboard -	Zongyuan Wang; Jiuyuan Zheng	China		Senri Ikuma; Haruki Suyama	Japan	Rui Jie Yong; Nurqayyum Mohamad	Malaysia	
Esports	Puzzle [Puyo Puyo Champions]	Yuki Kurihara	Japan		Dongshin Kang	South Korea	Tanarak Wongkitikun; Tzu-ang Kuo	Thailand; Chinese Taipei	
Esports	Fighting Games [Street Fighter 6, TEKKEN™ 8, THE KING OF FIGHTERS XV]		South Korea			Japan		Hong Kong; Saudi Arabia	
Fencing	Women's Foil Team		Japan			South Korea		Hong Kong; South Korea	
Fencing	Men's Sabre Team		South Korea			Japan		Hong Kong; Kazakhstan	
Kabaddi	Women's Team		India			Iran		Nepal**; Chinese Taipei**	
Kabaddi	Men's Team		India			Iran		Thailand**; Chinese Taipei**	
Shooting	50m Rifle 3 Positions Women Team		China	=AR		India		Kazakhstan	
Shooting	50m Rifle 3 Positions Women Individual	Jiayu Han	China	AR	Liyuan Zhang	China	Jieun Kim	South Korea	
Table tennis	Mixed Doubles	Shidong Lin; Man Kuai	China		Chuqin Wang; Yingsha Sun	China	Manush Shah; Diya Chitale; Jonghoon Lim; Yubin Shin	India**; South Korea**	
Weightlifting	Men's 70kg	Won Ju Ri	North Korea		Masanori Miyamoto	Japan	Albert Ian Delos Santos	Philippines	
Weightlifting	Men's 75kg	Rahmat Erwin Abdullah	Indonesia		Weeraphon Wichuma	Thailand	Chong Song Ri	North Korea	

=== Day 8: 27 September ===
At the end of the eighth day, China maintained its stand at the top of the medal table. One Asian record was beaten and two Asian Games records were broken.-->

Sport	Event	Gold medalists			Silver medalists		Bronze medalists		Ref
Sport	Event	Competitors	Team	Rec	Competitors	Team	Competitors	Team	Ref
Artistic swimming	Duet - Free Routine	Yanjun Lin; Huiyan Xu	China		Moe Higa; Tomoka Sato	Japan	Nargiza Bolatova; Yasmin Tuyakova	Kazakhstan	
Athletics	Men's Marathon Race Walk	Hayato Katsuki	Japan		Yingcheng Zhou	China	Motofumi Suwa	Japan	
Athletics	Women's Marathon Race Walk	Danzendquzong	China*****		Li Ma	China	Yukiko Umeno	Japan	
Athletics	Women's Long Jump	Yingying Huang	China		Ancy Sojan Edappilly	India	Mengyi Tan	China	
Athletics	Women's 200m	Shanti Pereira	Singapore		Yujie Chen	China	Harita Bhadra	India	
Athletics	Men's 200m	Puripol Boonson	Thailand	AR	Youwen Huang	China	Soshi Mizukubo	Japan	
Athletics	Men's High Jump	Chao-hsuan Fu	Chinese Taipei		Sarvesh Anil Kushare	India	Sanghyeok Woo	South Korea	
Athletics	Men's 110m Hurdles	Yuanjiang Chen	China		Rachid Muratake	Japan	John Tolentino	Philippines	
Athletics	Women's 100m Hurdles	Mako Fukube	Japan		Hitomi Nakajima	Japan	Yanni Wu	China	
Athletics	Women's Javelin Throw	Ziyi Yan	China	GR	Haruka Kitaguchi	Japan	Sae Takemoto	Japan	
Athletics	Men's Decathlon	Yuma Maruyama	Japan		Xinghua Chen	China	Tejaswin Shankar	India	
Athletics	Women's 3000m Steeplechase	Winfred Yave	Bahrain	GR	Norah Jeruto Tanui	Kazakhstan	Parul Chaudmary	India	
Baseball	Men's		South Korea			Japan		Chinese Taipei	
BMX Freestyle	Women's Park	Sibei Sun	China		Miharu Ozawa	Japan	Jiaqi Sun	China	
BMX Freestyle	Men's Park	Rimu Nakamura	Japan		Kaede Ozawa	Japan	Xiaolong Sha	China	
Diving	Women's Synchronised 3m Springboard	Yiwen Chen; Jia Chen	China		Suji Kim; Nahyun Kim	South Korea	Ker Ying Ong; Yiat Qi Lee	Malaysia	
Diving	Men's Synchronised 10m Platform	Hao Yang; Junjie Lian	China		Enrique Harold; Elvis Presley Clement	Malaysia	Jungwhi Shin; Yeongtaek Kim	South Korea	
Kurash	Women -57kg	Ibodatkhon Agojonova	Uzbekistan		Wan-ting Lee	Chinese Taipei	Pin-chun Wang; Natsumi Kuroki	Chinese Taipei; Japan	
Kurash	Men +90kg	Shokhrukhkhon Bakhtiyorov	Uzbekistan		Shakarmamad Mirmamadov	Tajikistan	Bekmurod Oltiboev; Kunathip Yea-on	Uzbekistan; Thailand	
Equestrian	Dressage Individual	Dongheon Nam on Leonidas	South Korea		Jiayi Yu on Jackpoint	China	Jiayi Rao on Geniaal	China	
Esports	MOBA [Pokémon UNITE]		Japan			Indonesia		South Korea; Philippines	
Fencing	Men's Épée Team		Kazakhstan			South Korea		Japan; Hong Kong	
Fencing	Women's Sabre Team		South Korea			Japan		China | Uzbekistan	
Handball	Women's Team								
Skateboarding	Women's Street	Yuanling Zhu	China		Yumeka Oda	Japan	Chenxi Cui	China	
Skateboarding	Men's Street	Juni Kang	South Korea		Toa Sasaki	Japan	Ginwoo Onodera	Japan	
Squash	Mixed Doubles	Ka Yi Lee; Ming Hong Tang	Hong Kong		Yee Lam Toby Tse; Cheuk Nam Lai	Hong Kong	Joshana Chinappa; Velavan Senthilkumar; Ameeshenraj Chandaran; Rachel Mae Arnold	India; Malaysia	
Squash	Women's Singles	Sivasangari Subramaniam	Malaysia		Anahat Singh	India	Satomi Watanabe; Sin Yuk Chan	Japan; Hong Kong	
Squash	Men's Singles	Eain Yow Ng	Malaysia		Abhay Singh	India	Muhammad Irfan; Noor Zaman	Pakistan; Pakistan	
Table tennis	Men's Doubles	Youzheng Huang; Shidong Lin	China		Tomokazu Harimoto; Hiroto Shinozuka	Japan	Sora Matsushima; Shunsuke Togami; Ruibo Wen; Peng Xiang	Japan; China	
Table tennis	Women's Singles	Manyu Wang	China		Yingsha Sun	China	Miwa Harimomto	Japan	
Trampolining	Men's	Langyu Yan	China		Zisai Wang	China	Yerlan Tasmagambetov	Kazakhstan	
Trampolining	Women's	Hikaru Mori	Japan		Megu Uyama	Japan	Zheng Qui	China	
Weightlifting	Women's 69kg	Kuk Hyang Song	North Korea		Wen-huei Chen	Chinese Taipei	Ingrid Grueso	Bahrain	
Weightlifting	Women's 77kg	Renxiu He	China		Ayanat Zhumagali	Kazakhstan	Reihaneh Karimi	Iran	

=== Day 9: 28 September ===
At the end of the ninth day, China maintained its stand at the top of the medal table. One Asian Games record was tied during the event (which was decided by a shoot-off) beaten and two Asian Games records were broken.

Sport	Event	Gold medalists			Silver medalists		Bronze medalists		Ref
Sport	Event	Competitors	Team	Rec	Competitors	Team	Competitors	Team	Ref
Artistic swimming	Mixed Team - Free Routine		China			Japan		Kazakhstan	
Athletics	Women's Discus Throw	Bin Feng	China		Zhichao Jiang	China	Subenrat Insaeng	Thailand	
Athletics	Women's 400m Hurdles	Mariam Kareem	United Arab Emirates	GR	Adelina Zems	Kazakhstan	Vithya Ramraj	India	
Athletics	Men's 400m Hurdles	Bassem Hemeida	Qatar		Taiju Goto	Japan	Chung-wei Lin	Chinese Taipei	
Athletics	Men's 3000m Steeplechase	Ryuji Miura	Japan		Ryoma Aoki	Japan	Zakaria Elahlaami	Qatar	
Athletics	Men's Long Jump	Yuhao Shi	China		Murali Sreeshankar	India	Anvar Anvarov	Uzbekistan	
Athletics	Men's 1500m	Kazut Iizawa	Japan	GR	Gulveer Singh	India	Nagiya Mori	Japan	
Athletics	Men's Javelin Throw	Rumesh Pathirage	Sri Lanka		Yashvir Singh	India	Rohit Yadav	India	
Athletics	Women's 5000m	Winfred Yavi	Bahrain		Nozomi Tanaka	Japan	Parul Chaudhary	India	
Athletics	Women's 4 x 100m Relay		China			Thailand		Japan	
Athletics	Men's 4 x 100m Relay		China			Chinese Taipei		South Korea	
BMX Freestyle	Women's	Sae Hatakeyama	Japan		Wanyi Liao	China	Jasmine Azzahra Setyobudi	Indonesia	
BMX Freestyle	Men's	Jasmine Azzahra Setyobudi	Japan		Hyoga Kiuchi	Japan	Haochao Lin	China	
Diving	Women's 1m Springboard	Shan Lin	China		Yiping Long	China	Suji Kim	South Korea	
Diving	Men's 1m Springboard	Zongyuan Wang	China		Yeongnam Kim	South Korea	Chengzan Liu]	China	
Kurash	Women -78kg	Pokizakhon Kamoldinova	Uzbekistan		Sumin Mo	South Korea	Shokhista Nazarova; Pincky Balhara	Uzbekistan; India	
Kurash	Men -81kg	Akxror Ziyodullaev	Uzbekistan		Ramin Ahmadzadeh	Iran	Adilet Akhmetgali = Ken Oyoshi	Kazakhstan; Japan	
Esports	MOBA [Honor of Kings]		China		Malaysia		Hong Kong; Philippines		
Shooting	25m Pistol Women Team		China			South Korea		Chinese Taipei	
Shooting	25m Pistol Women Individual	Jiaruixuan Xiao******	China	=GR	Esha Singh*****	India	Hyon Suk Kim	North Korea	
Surfing									
Table tennis	Women's Doubles	Man Kuai; Manyu Wang	China		Miwa Harimoto; Hina Hayata	Japan	Hoi Kem Doo; Wing Lam Ng; Suthasini Sawettabut; Orawan Paranang	Hong Kong; Thailand	
Table tennis	Men's Singles	Shidong Lin	China		Chuqin Wang	China	Noshad Alamiyan; Yun-ju Lin	Iran; Chinese Taipei	
Weightlifting	Men's 85kg	Kwang Ryol Ro	North Korea		Alexey Churkin	Kazakhstan	Shunnan Chen	China	
Weightlifting	Men's 95kg	Ali Alipour	Iran		Nurgissa Adiletuly	Kazakhstan	Yi Tu	China	

=== Day 10: 29 September ===
At the end of the tenth day, China maintained its stand at the top of the medal table, while one team was added to the table. Three Asian record was beaten and four Asian Games records were broken.

Sport	Event	Gold medalists			Silver medalists		Bronze medalists		Ref
Sport	Event	Competitors	Team	Rec	Competitors	Team	Competitors	Team	Ref
Athletics	Men's Pole Vault	Ernest John Obiena	Philippines	GR	Jie Yao	China	Chenyang Li	China	
Athletics	Women's High Jump	Barnokhon Sayfullaeva	Uzbekistan		Kristina Ovchinnikova	Kazakhstan	Pooja	India	
Athletics	Women's Hammer Throw	Jiale Zhang	China	AR	Jie Zhao	China	Joy Iris McArthur	Japan	
Athletics	Women's 800m	Hongjiao Wu	China		Nelly Korir	Bahrain	Victoria Bossong	Philippines	
Athletics	Men's 800m	Ko Ochiai	Japan	GR	Ali Amirian	Iran	Abubaker Abdalla	Qatar	
Athletics	Men's 5000m	Birhanu Balew	Bahrain		Tomonori Yamaguchi	Japan	Gulveer Singh	India	
Athletics	4 x 100m Relay Mixed		China			Thailand		India	
Athletics	Women's 4 x 400m Relay		India			Bahrain		China	
Athletics	Men's 4 x 400m Relay		Japan			Qatar		India	
Badminton	Mixed Doubles	Zhen Bang Jiang; Yaxin Wei	China		Amri Syahnawi; Nita Violina Marwah	Indonesia	Yan Zhe Feng; Dongping Huang; Hong-Wei Ye; Nicole Gonzales Chan	China**; Chinese Taipei**	
Badminton	Women's Doubles	Sohee Lee; Hana Baek	South Korea		Sheng Shu Liu; Ning Tan	China	Kie Nakanishi; Rin Uesaka; Pearly Koong Le Tan; Thinaah Muralitharan	Japan**; Malaysia**	
Badminton	Men's Doubles	Daniel Marthin; Leo R. Carnando	Indonesia		Weikeng Liang; Chang Wang	China	Won Ho Kim; Seung Jae Seo; Fajar Alfian; Muhammad Shohibul Fikri	South Korea**; Indonesia**	
Badminton	Women's Singles	Seyoung An	South Korea		Akane Yamaguchi	Japan	Zhi Yi Wang; Yu Fei Chen	China**; China**	
Badminton	Men's Singles	Kunlavut Vitidsarn	Thailand		Kean Yew Loh	Singapore	Alwi Farhan; Tae Bin Yoo	Indonesia**; South Korea**	
Cycling track	Women's Team Sprint		China	AR		Malaysia		Chinese Taipei	
Cycling track	Men's Team Sprint		China	GR		Japan		Hong Kong	
Diving	Women's 10m Platform	Yuxi Chen	China		Wei Lu	China	Jin Mi Jo	North Korea	
Diving	Men's 3m Springboard	Zongyuan Wang	China		Jiuyuan Zheng	China	Sho Sakai	Japan	
Esports	Battle Royale [PUBG MOBILE - Asian Games Version]		Thailand			China		Pakistan	
Handball			Bahrain			Qatar		Japan	
Kurash	Women +87kg	Minyoung Kim	South Korea		Liu Li-ling Shih	Chinese Taipei	Fatemeh Barmaki Kordkolaee; Arailym Shegenova	Iran; Kazakhstan	
Kurash	Men -66kg	Majid Vahid Barimanlou	Iran		Yosin Bobokalonov	Tajikistan	Kubanychbek Aibek Uulu; Sarvar Abdushukurov	Kyrgyzstan; Tajikistan	
Sepak takraw	Women's Double		Vietnam			Philippines		Laos; South Korea	
Sepak takraw	Men's Regu		Thailand			Malaysia		Vietnam; Philippines	
Shooting	Trap Men Team		Kuwait			Qatar		Kazakhstan	
Shooting	Trap Women Team		China			India		Kuwait	
Shooting	Trap Women Individual	Neeru	India	AR	Yunong Sun	China	Hajar Abdulmalik	Kuwait	
Shooting	Trap Men Individual	Khaled Almudhaf	Kuwait	GR	Kun-Pi Yang	Chinese Taipei	Ying Qi	China	
Weightlifting	Women's 86kg	Yan Wu	China		Alina Marushchak	Bahrain	Mahsa Beheshty	Iran	
Weightlifting	Men's 110kg	Akbar Djuraev	Uzbekistan		Shahzadbek Matyakubov	Turkmenistan	Huanhua Liu	China	
Weightlifting	Women's +86kg	Wenwen Li	China		Hyejeong Park	South Korea	Ouisal Ikhlef	Qatar	
Weightlifting	Men's +110kg	Ali Davoudi	Iran		Ali Ammar Yusur Rubaiawi	Iraq	Gor Minasyan	Armenia	

=== Day 11: 30 September ===
At the end of the eleventh day, China maintained its stand at the top of the medal table. Four Asian record were broken.

Sport	Event	Gold medalists			Silver medalists		Bronze medalists		Ref
Sport	Event	Competitors	Team	Rec	Competitors	Team	Competitors	Team	Ref
Archery	Compound Women's Team		India			China		South Korea	
Archery	Compound Mixed Team		India			South Korea		China	
Canoeing - Slalom	Men's Kayak Single	Zhaoshan Hu	China		Yuuki Tanaka	Japan	Alexandr Korobov	Kazakhstan	
Canoeing - Slalom	Women's Canoe Single	Juan Huang	China		Atcharaporn Duanglawa	Thailand	Anastassiya Ananyeva	Kazakhstan	
Cycling - Track	Women's Team Pursuit		China	AR		Japan		South Korea	
Cycling - Track	Men's Team Pursuit		China	AR		Japan		South Korea	
Cycling - Track	Women's Keirin	Liying Yuan	China		Lijuan Wang	China	Nurul Izzah Izzati Muhammad Asri	Malaysia	
Diving	Women's 3m Springboard	Yiwen Chen	China		Jia Chen	China	Sayaka Mikami	Japan	
Diving	Men's 10m Platform	Junjie Lian	China		Rikuto Tamai	Japan	Renjie Zhao	China	
Esports	1v4 asymmetrical survival game [Identity V - Asian Games Version]		China			Japan		Malaysia; Chinese Taipei	
Judo	Women -48kg	Mitsuki Kondo	Japan		Abiba Abuzhakynova	Kazakhstan	Ahliya Muminova; Narantsetseg Ganbaatar	Tajikistan; Mongolia	
Judo	Men -60kg	Hayato Kondo	Japan		Yeldos Smetov	Kazakhstan	Yulin Ma; Samariddin Kuchkarov	China; Uzbekistan	
Judo	Women -52kg	Sita Kadamboeva	Uzbekistan		Seyun Jang	South Korea	Aoyu Xu; Kokoro Fujishiro	China; Japan	
Judo	Men -66kg	Yolk Kazirbyek	Mongolia		Abdurakhim Nutfulloev	Uzbekistan	Sukhrob Boqiev; Ziyang Xue	Bahrain; China	
Shooting	Trap Mixed Team		India	AsR		Qatar		China	
Sport climbing	Men's Boulder	Sorato Anraku	Japan		Dohyun Lee	South Korea	Tomoa Narasaki	Japan	
Sport climbing	Women's Speed 4	Desak Made Rita Kusuma Dewi	Indonesia	AR	Lijuan Deng	China	Jimin Jeong	South Korea	
Wrestling	Men's Greco-Roman 67kg	Aytjan Khalmakhanov	Uzbekistan		Kyotaro Sogabe	Japan	Razzak Beishekeev = Meiirzhan Shermakhanbet	Kyrgyzstan; Kazakhstan	
Wrestling	Men's Greco-Roman 87kg	Taizo Yoshida	Japan		Asan Kurbanovich Zhanyshov	India	Jalgasbay Berdimuratov; Sunil Kumar	Uzbekistan; India	
Wrestling	Men's Greco-Roman 130kg	Amin Mirzazadeh	Iran		Rafae Tsitsuashvili	Georgia	Lingzhe Meng; Minseok Kim	China; South Korea	
Wrestling	Women's Wrestling 68kg	Ami Ishii	Japan		Sol Gum Pak	North Korea	Meerim Zhumanazarova; Jia Long	Kyrgyzstan; China	

=== Day 12: 1 October ===
At the end of the twelfth day, China maintained its stand at the top of the medal tableOne Asian record was beaten together (differentiated by a tie-breaker.

Sport	Event	Gold medalists			Silver medalists		Bronze medalists		Ref
Sport	Event	Competitors	Team	Rec	Competitors	Team	Competitors	Team	Ref
Archery	Compound Women's Individual	Nurisa Dian Ashrifah	Indonesia		Amaya Amparo Cojuangco	Philippines	Yeonseo Kang	South Korea	
Archery	Compound Men's Individual	Jongho Kim	South Korea		Cheng-Wei Chang	Chinese Taipei	Ganesh Mani Ratnam Thirumuru	India	
Canoeing - Slalom	Men's Canoe Single	Zhicheng Zhang	China		Jung-cheng Wu	Chinese Taipei	Piyanath Koetsuk	Thailand	
Canoeing - Slalom	Women's Kayak Single	Kurumi Ito	Japan		Lin Chen	China	Yekaterina Tarantseva	Kazakhstan	
Cycling - Track	Women's Madison		Japan			Hong Kong		China	
Cycling - Track	Men's Omnium	Kanta Umezawa	Japan		Tsun Wai Chu	Hong Kong	Junjie Wu	China	
Cycling - Track	Men's Sprint	Kaiya Ota	Japan		Zhiwei Li	China	Mohammad Azizulhasni Awang	Malaysia	
Equestrian	Jumping Team		Saudi Arabia			United Arab Emirates		Japan	
Esports	MOBA [League of Legends]		Myanmar			Indonesia		Chinese Taipei; South Korea	
Ju-jitsu	Men -62kg	Khaled Alshehhi	United Arab Emirates		Omar Alsuwaidi	United Arab Emirates	Abdulmalik Mohammed A Al Murdhi; Khaled Ali S Habab	Saudi Arabia	
Ju-jitsu	Men -69kg	Ahmed Andeez	United Arab Emirates		Nurzhan Batyrbekov	Kazakhstan	Mohammed Ibrahim M Bin Huraymil; Seonghyeon Joo	Saudi Arabia; South Korea	
Ju-jitsu	Women -48kg	Balqees Abdulla	United Arab Emirates		Alaonod Alharbi	United Arab Emirates	Zhibek Kulumbetova; Miyu Suzuki	Kazakhstan | Thailand	
Judo	Women -57kg	Mimi Huh	South Korea		Ariunzaya Terbish	Mongolia	Mio Shirakane; Hyon A Kim	Japan; North Korea	
Judo	Men -73kg	Kazbek Naguchev	United Arab Emirates		Shakhram Ahadov	Uzbekistan	Tatsuki Ishihara; Muhiddin Asadulloev	Japan; Tajikistan	
Judo	Women -63kg	Narumi Tanioka	Japan		Ji Hye Kim	North Korea	Esmigul Kuyulova; Enkhriilen Lkhagvatogoo	Kazakhstan; Mongolia	
Judo	Men -81kg	Sotaro Fujiwara	Japan		Adilet Almat	Kazakhstan	Abubakr Sherov; Joonhwan Lee	Tajikistan; South Korea	
Judo	Women -70kg	Rin Maeda	Japan		Azhar Askhat	Kazakhstan	Anujin Uran-Ulzii; Song Hui Mun	Mongolia; North Korea	
Sailing	Men's Skiff	Zaiding Helm Wen; Tian Liu	China		Prince Helm Kurisinkal Noble; Manu Francis	India	Akira Luke Helm Sakai; Russell Williams Aylsworth	Hong Kong	
Sailing	Women's Skiff	Misaki Helm Tanaka; Sera Nagamatsu	Japan		Emily Grace Helm Polson; Hiu Tung Tiffany Mak	Hong Kong	Harshita Helm Tomar; Shital Verma	India	
Shooting	25m Rapid Fire Pistol Men Team		South Korea			China		Indonesia	
Shooting	25m Rapid Fire Pistol Men Individual	Gunhyeok Lee	South Korea	=AsR	Lianbofan Su	China	Ghulam Mustafa Bashir	Pakistan	
Sport climbing	Women's Boulder	Yuetong Zhang	China		Ai Mori	Japan	Chaehyun Seo	South Korea	
Sport climbing	Men's Speed 4	Shouhong Chu	China		Reza Ali Pour Shenazandi Fard	Iran	Damir Toktarov	Kazakhstan	
Taekwondo	Women Individual Poomsae	Haeun Jung	South Korea		Juliana Mykhail Candelaria	Philippines	Thitaree Kaewolanwasu	Thailand	
Taekwondo	Men Individual Poomsae	Kyusung Yun	South Korea		Navin Pinthasute	Thailand	Jeus Gabriel Derick Yape	Philippines	
Wrestling	Men's Greco-Roman 77kg	Alireza Abdevali	Iran		Nao Kusaka	Japan	Akzhol Makhmudov; Shahin Badaghimofrad	Kyrgyzstan; Qatar	
Wrestling	Men's Greco-Roman 97kg	Yuri Nakazato	Japan		Nitesh	India	Gankhuyag Ganbaatar; Mehdi Balihamzehdeh	Mongolia; Iran	
Wrestling	Women's Wrestling 62kg	Nonoka Ozaki	Japan		Ok Ju Kim	North Korea	Altjin Togtokh; Qi Zhang	Mongolia; China	
Wrestling	Men's Greco-Roman 60kg	Zholoman Sharshenbekov	Kyrgyzstan		Alisher Ganiev	Uzbekistan	Sajjad Ali Mukasr Albidhan; Ayata Suzuki	Iraq; Japan	

=== Day 13: 2 October ===
At the end of the thirteenth day, China maintained its stand at the top of the medal table.

Sport	Event	Gold medalists			Silver medalists		Bronze medalists		Ref
Sport	Event	Competitors	Team	Rec	Competitors	Team	Competitors	Team	Ref
Archery	Recurve Women's Team		India			South Korea		China	
Archery	Recurve Mixed Team		China			India		South Korea	
Archery	Recurve Men's Team		South Korea			India		Chinese Taipei	
Beach volleyball	Women's	Taravadee Naraphornrapat; Worapeerachayakorn Kongphopsarutawadee	Thailand		Xinyi Xia; Xu Yan	China	Khylem Harl Progella; Sofiah Shanine Pagara	Philippines	
Boxing	Women's 51kg	Yu Wu	China	Thi Tam Nguyen	Vietnam	Feruza Kazakova; Alua Balkibekova	Uzbekistan* | Kazakhstan*		
Boxing	Women's 60kg	Yu-ting Lin	China	Chengyu Yang	Chinese Taipei	Sitora Turdibekova; Priya	Uzbekistan* | India*		
Boxing	Women's 75kg	Lovlina Borgohain	India	Ziyi Bao	China	Natalya Bogdanova; Diem Quynh Luu	Kazakhstan* | Vietnam*		
Boxing	Men's 55kg	Rui Yamaguchi	Japan	Carlo Paalam	Philippines	Bilguunsaikhan Kharkhuu; Makhmud Sabyrkhan	Mongolia* | Kazakhstan*		
Boxing	Men's 70kg	Torekhan Sabyrkhan	Kazakhstan	Zeyad Eashash	Jordan	Shavkatjon Boltaev; Sewonrets Quincy Mensah Okazawa	Uzbekistan* | Japan*		
Boxing	Men's 90kg	Turabek Khabibullaev	Uzbekistan	Xuezhen Han	China	Kapil Pokhariya; Parviz Karimov	India* | Tajikistan*		
Boxing	Women's 54kg	Natnicha Chongprongklang	Thailand	Chol Mi Pang	North Korea	Tsukimi Namiki; Xuan Zhao	Japan* | China*		
Boxing	Women's 65kg	Parveen	India	Nien-chin Chen	Chinese Taipei	Shu Li; Hyo Sun Hwang	China* | North Korea*		
Boxing	Men's 60kg	Abdumalik Khalokov	Uzbekistan	Donghwan Jang	South Korea	Shunsuke Kitamoto; Akmal Ubaidov	Japan* | Tajikistan*		
Boxing	Men's 80kg	Ankush	India	Minseong Kim	South Korea	Fazliddin Erkinboev; Hussein Iashaish	Uzbekistan* | Jordan*		
Boxing	Men's +90kg	Aibek Oralbay	Kazakhstan	Jakhongir Zokirov	Uzbekistan	Narender; Amir Esmaeili Vandaei	India* | Iran*		
Canoeing - Slalom	Women's Kayak Cross	Lin Chen	China		Chu-han Chang	Chinese Taipei	Linxi Xu	China	
Canoeing - Slalom	Men's Kayak Cross	Yuuki Tanaka	Japan		Xin Quan	China	Zhaoshan Hu	China	
Cycling - Track	Men's Madison	Naoki Kojima; Kazushige Kuboki	Japan		Haijiao Sun; Junjie Wu	China	Sergey Rostovtsev; Nikita Tsvetkov	Uzbekistan	
Cycling - Track	Men's Keirin	Mohammed Azizulhasni Awang	Malaysia		Zhiwei Li	China	Han Xie	China	
Cycling - Track	Women's Omnium	Yumi Kajihara	Japan		Rinata Sultanova	Kazakhstan	Sze Wing Lee	Hong Kong	
Cycling - Track	Women's Sprint	Liying Yuan	China		Mina Sato	Japan	Yulu Jiang	China	
Esports	MOBA [League of Legends]		South Korea			Chinese Taipei		Saudi Arabia** | Vietnam**	
Field hockey	Women's		India			China		Japan	
Football	Women's		Japan			North Korea		South Korea	
Judo	Men -90kg	Riku Okada	Japan		Erlan Sherov	Kyrgyzstan	Qi Han; Jonghoon Kim	China; South Korea	
Judo	Women -78kg	Mizuki Sugimura	Japan		Minju Kim	South Korea	Aqulina Chayeb; Ekaterina Tokareva	Lebanon; Kazakhstan	
Judo	Men -100kg	Ryotaro Masuchi	Japan		Dzhakhongir Madzhidov	Tajikistan	Juyeop Han; Ernazar Sarsenbaev	South Korea; Uzbekistan	
Judo	Women +78kg	Xinran Niu	China		Hyeonji Lee	South Korea	Adiyasuren Amarsaikhan; Miki Mukunoki	Mongolia; Japan	
Judo	Men +100kg	Muzaffarbek Turoboyev	Uzbekistan		Hyoga Ota	Japan	Gonchigsuren Batkhuyag; Minjong Kim	Mongolia; South Korea	
Sailing	Men's Windsurfing	Kun Bi	China		Taehoon Lee	South Korea	William McMillan	Thailand	
Sailing	Boys' Skiff	Ethan Lachlan Kiu; Louis Oliver Polson	Hong Kong		Kok Wei Sean Kum; Nigel Xu Yuan Tan	Singapore	Muhammad Adam Aierell; Musmuliadi Iqbal Nazham	Malaysia	
Sailing	Women's Windsurfing	Wenqi Li	China		Kwan Ching Ma	Hong Kong	Rina Niijima	Japan	
Sailing	Girls' Skiff	KONG Chloe Kong; Mccarley Wong	Hong Kong		Natsumi Funazawa; Natsuko Funazawa	Japan	Nor Izniey Humaira Mohammed Azri; Aina Zulaikha Azizul Rahman	Malaysia	
Sailing	Mixed Dinghy	Tetsuya M Isozaki; Yurie Seki	Japan		Changju Kim; Gyeongjin Lee	South Korea	Wenju Dong; Hailun Xiao	China	
Sailing	Men's Dinghy	Jeemin Ha	South Korea		Nicholas Bezy Halliday	Hong Kong	Khairulnizam Mohammed Afendy	Malaysia	
Sailing	Women's Dinghy	Sophia Montgomery	Thailand		Jania Ang	Singapore	Nethra Kumanan	India	
Squash	Women's Team		Malaysia			Hong Kong		India**; Japan**	
Squash	Men's Team		Malaysia			Pakistan		Hong Kong**; India**	
Taekwondo	Women -49kg	Jingyue Ma	China		Tachiana Keizha Mangin	Philippines	Ruka Okamoto; Patcharakan Poolkerd	Japan; Thailand	
Taekwondo	Men -58kg	Tamirlan Tleules	Kazakhstan		Kurt Bryan Barbosa	Philippines	Jafar Aldaoud; Hyangsik An	Jordan; South Korea	
Taekwondo	Women -67kg	Saghar Moradi Sheikhlari	Iran		Ozoda Sobirjonova	Uzbekistan	Min Ju Kwak; Wei-chia Wang	South Korea; Chinese Taipei	
Taekwondo	Men -80kg	Jasurbek Jaysunov	Uzbekistan		Jiun-yi Hung	Chinese Taipei	Saleh Elsharabaty; Batyrkhan Toleugali	Jordan; Kazakhstan	
Tennis	Women's Singles	Xiyu Wang	China		Shuai Zhang	China	Yuliya Putintseva; Alexandra Eala	Kazakhstan**; Philippines**	
Tennis	Men's Doubles	Yusuke Kusuhara; Shunsuke Nakagawa	Japan		Jisung Nam; Uisung Park]]	Philippines	Chenjui Ho; Yu-hsiou Hsu; Fumin Jiang; Tianhui Zhang	Chinese Taipei**; China**	
Virtual taekwondo	Mixed Individual Virtual Taekwondo	Jeus Gabriel Derick Yape	Philippines		Ngoc Tuyet Sang Chau	Vietnam	Zong Han Darren Yap; Rita Bakisheva]]	Indonesia; Kazakhstan	
Wrestling	Men's Freestyle 65kg	Sujeet	India		Abdulmazhid Kudiev	Tajikistan	Kotaro Kiyooka; Nachyn Kuular	Japan; Kazakhstan	
Wrestling	Men's Freestyle 86kg	Mohammad Nokhodilarimi	Iran		Hayato Ishiguro	Japan	Malik Shavaev; Suldkhuu Olonbayar	Kyrgyzstan; Mongolia	
Wrestling	Men's Freestyle 125kg	Amir Hossein Zare	Iran		Buheeerdun	China	Shamil Sharipov; Yedige Kassimbek	Bahrain; Kazakhstan	
Wrestling	Women's Wrestling 50kg	Yui Susaki	Japan		Son Hyang Kim	North Korea	Ziqi Feng; Zeinep Bayanova	China; Kazakhstan	
Wrestling	Women's Wrestling 76kg	Yuka Kagami	Japan		Elmira Syedykova	Kazakhstan	Aiperi Medet Kyzy; Wenji Li	Kyrgyzstan; China	

=== Day 14: 3 October ===
At the end of the fourteenth day, China maintained its stand at the top of the medal table.

Sport	Event	Gold medalists			Silver medalists		Bronze medalists		Ref
Sport	Event	Competitors	Team	Rec	Competitors	Team	Competitors	Team	Ref
Archery	Recurve Women's Individual	Kumkum Anil Mohod	India		Yejin Oh	South Korea	Yuwei Huang	China	
Archery	Recurve Men's Individual	Wooseok Lee	South Korea		Junya Nakanishi	Japan	Neeraj Chauhan	India	
Beach volleyball	Men's	Cherif Samba; Ahmed Janko	Qatar		Sofyan Rachman Efendi; Bintang Akbar	Indonesia	Kota Kurosawa; Taito Mizumachi	Japan	
Breakdancing	B-Girls	Royal (Pu Guo)	China		Ayumi (Ayumi Fukushima)	Japan	671 (Qingyi Liu)	China	
Breakdancing	B-Boys	Shigekix (Shigeyuki Nakarai)	Japan		Hongten (Hongyul Kim)	South Korea	Monkey Z (Ruimiao Wang)	China	
Cricket	Men's		India			Pakistan		Sri Lanka	
Field hockey	Men's		India			Malaysia		Pakistan	
Football	Men's		South Korea			Japan		China	
Golf	Women's Individual Stroke Play	Pranavi Sharath Urs	India		Ruoning Yin	China	Shannon Xuan Yin Tan	Singapore	
Golf	Women's Team		China			India		Chinese Taipei	
Golf	Men's Individual Stroke Play	Joohyung Kim	South Korea		Kazuki Higa	Japan	Sadom Kaewkanjana	Thailand	
Golf	Men's Team		China			South Korea		Japan	
Gymnastics - Rhythmic	Individual All-Around	Takhmina Ikromova	Uzbekistan		Qi Wang	China	Zilu Wang	China	
Gymnastics - Rhythmic	Group All-Around		China			Japan		Kazakhstan	
Ju-jitsu	Men -85kg	Abdullah Tariq N Nada	Saudi Arabia		Merey Kabdullayev	Kazakhstan	Mingyu Kim; Abdurahman Murtazaliev	South Korea; Kyrgyzstan	
Ju-jitsu	Women -63kg	Orapa Senatham	Thailand		Alexandria Luz Enriquez	Philippines	Narankhishig Baasanjargal; Marian Zhuravleva	Mongolia; Kazakhstan	
Judo	Mixed Team		Japan			Kazakhstan		China; Uzbekistan	
Padel	Women's Pairs	Saki Tsukamoto; Kae Tokumoto	Japan		Fadona Kusumawati; Fitriani Sabatini	Indonesia	Novela Putria; Beatrice Gumulya	Indonesia	
Padel	Men's Pairs	Mashari Naif; Rashed Naif	Qatar		Christian Chin; Aidan Yunus	Malaysia	Farsad Shahi; Amirmohammad Jamshidi	Iran	
Rugby sevens	Women's		Japan			China		Hong Kong	
Rugby sevens	Men's		Hong Kong			China		Japan	
Sailing	Girls' Windsurfing	Tsz Yuet Cheung	Hong Kong		Akari Oshima	Japan	Chanatkan Chargensuk	Thailand	
Sailing	Boys' Windsurfing	Tsz Ho Wong	Hong Kong		Masato Kozono	Japan	John Tze Xiang Wong	Singapore	
Sailing	Boys' Dinghy	Jiun Choi	South Korea		Ian Goh	Singapore	Tiago Cheng de Villemor Salgado	Hong Kong	
Sailing	Youth Mixed Dinghy	Misaki Tsunomori; Riho Sanematsu	Japan		Pitipoom Jaroenpon; Worrakan Saksriklom	Thailand	Gaeun Choi; Taerin Kim	South Korea	
Sailing	Girls' Dinghy	Pinchanok Klaysomboon	Thailand		Zixi Huang	Hong Kong	Songha Lee	South Korea	
Sepak takraw	Women's Quadrant		Vietnam			Thailand		Japan**; Indonesia**	
Sepak takraw	Men's Quadrant		Japan			Indonesia		India; Myanmar**	
Sport climbing	Women's Lead	Chaehyun Seo	South Korea		Ai Mori	Japan	Yuetong Zhang	China	
Sport climbing	Men's Lead	Neo Suzuki	Japan		Satone Yoshida	Japan	Dohyun Lee	South Korea	
Softball	Women's		Japan			China		Chinese Taipei	
Taekwondo	Women -57kg	Fadia Khirfan	Jordan		Chuling Zhang	China	Wei-chun Lln; Natkamon Wassana	Chinese Taipei; Thailand	
Taekwondo	Men -68kg	Banlung Tubtimdang	Thailand		Mahdi Hajimousaeinafouti	Iran	Zaid Abdul Kareem; Jinho Mun	Jordan; South Korea	
Taekwondo	Women +67kg	Dabin Song	South Korea		Wenzhe Mu	China	Fatemeh Ahmadi; Svetlana Saidova	Iran; Uzbekistan	
Taekwondo	Men +80kg	Arian Salimi	Iran		Marat Mavlonov	Uzbekistan	Mohammad Aladarbi; Sanghyun Kang	Jordan; South Korea	
Tennis	Men's Singles	Coleman Wong	Hong Kong		Yibing Wu	China	Khumoyun Sultanov; Hayato Matsuoka	Uzbekistan**; Japan**	
Tennis	Women's Doubles	Su-wei Hsieh; En-shuo Liang	Chinese Taipei		Hao-ching Chang; Fang-hsien Wu	Chinese Taipei	Eudice Chong; Hong Yi Wong; Anna Danilina; Yuliya Putintseva	Hong Kong**; Kazakhstan**	
Tennis	Mixed Doubles	Ena Shibahara; Jay Friend	Japan		Shuko Aoyama; Yusuke Kusuhara	Japan	Xinyu Jiang; Tianhui Zhang; Su-wei Hsieh; Chun-hsin Tseng	China**; Chinese Taipei**	
Volleyball	Men's		Iran			Japan		Pakistan	
Wrestling	Men's Freestyle 57kg	Aman	India		Chong Song Han	North Korea	Wanhao Zou; Aiaal Belolyubskii	China; Tajikistan	
Wrestling	Men's Freestyle 74kg	Yones Emamichoghaei	Iran		Yoshinosuke Aoyagi	Japan	Viktor Rassadin; Nurkozha Kaipanov	Tajikistan; Kazakhstan	
Wrestling	Men's Freestyle 97kg	Amirali Azarpira	Iran		Sherzod Poyonov	Uzbekistan	Deepak Punia; Arash Yoshida	India; Japan	
Wrestling	Women's Wrestling 53kg	Moe Kiyooka	Japan		Antim	India	Jin Zhang; Otgontuya Bayanmunkh	China; Mongolia	
Wrestling	Women's Wrestling 57kg	Kexin Hong	China		Il Sim Son	North Korea	Nilufar Raimova; Akari Fujinami	Kazakhstan; Japan	

=== Day 15: 4 October ===
At the end of the Asian Games 2026, China led the medal table with more than double the second-placed host, Japan, with South Korea rounding up the top 3.

Sport	Event	Gold medalists			Silver medalists		Bronze medalists		Ref
Sport	Event	Competitors	Team	Rec	Competitors	Team	Competitors	Team	Ref
Equestrian	Jumping,Individual Competition A(heights of 1.40-1.50m)	Faleh Alajami on Qapella	Qatar		Abdulla Almheiri on Hudson de Vains	United Arab Emirates	Khaled Abdulrahman S Almobty on Diana du Plevau Z	Saudi Arabia	
Equestrian	Jumping,Individual Competition B(heights of up to 1.55m)	Ramzy Hamad A Alduhami on Untouchable 32	Saudi Arabia		Abdulrahman Bader M Alrajhi on Lorenzo Es	Saudi Arabia	Basem Mohammed on Chaccball	Qatar	

== Notes ==
* Game was played two days prior.
** Game was played one day prior.
*** In wushu, if a player leads by 12 points mean s/he wins without finishing regulation time.
**** In wushu, the referee can stop the bout if it is a clear knockout or an injury. *****The result was challenged. ******Both gold and silver medallists equalled the Asian Games record and a shoot-off decided the winner.
