= Soft tennis at the 2026 Asian Games – Women's team =

Women's team at the 2026 Asian Games
- Venue: Higashiyama Park Tennis Center
- Location: Nagoya, Aichi Prefecture, Japan
- Dates: 18–20 September 2026
- Competitors: 40 from 8 nations

Medalists
gold medal	Japan; Rio Maeda; Sakura Nakatani; Ayaka Iwakura; Rena Temma; Kiho Miyamae
silver medal	Chinese Taipei; Chou Yen-chen; Chiang Min-yu; Lo Shu-ting; Hsu Chiao-ying; Huang Shih-yuan
bronze medal	South Korea; Eom Ye-jin; Kim Yeon-hwa; Hwang Jung-mi; Kim Han-sol; Lee Su-jin
bronze medal	Philippines; Princess Catindig; Noelle Manalac; Christy Sanosa; Shyryn Salazar; Hilary Paas

The women's team soft tennis event is part of the soft tennis programme and is taking place on 18 until 20 September 2026, at the Higashiyama Park Tennis Center, in Nagoya, Aichi Prefecture.

== Schedule ==
All times are Japan Standard Time (UTC+09:00)

Date	Time	Event
Friday, 18 September 2026	09:00	Preliminary round
Sunday, 20 September 2026	09:00	Semifinals
Sunday, 20 September 2026	14:00	Final

== Results ==
=== Preliminary round ===
==== Group A ====
Pos	Team	Pld	W	L	MF	MA	MD	Qualification
1	Japan	3	3	0	9	0	+9	Semifinals
2	South Korea	3	2	1	6	3	+3	Semifinals
3	Cambodia	3	1	2	3	6	−3	
4	Pakistan	3	0	3	0	9	−9	

Source: 20th Asian Games Aichi-Nagoya 2026

18 September	Japan	3–0	Cambodia

Rio Maeda / Sakura Nakatani	5–0	Chankanha Chhorn / Chanroseka Khun	4–0, 4–0, 4–0, 4–0, 5–3, 4–1
Ayaka Iwakura	4–0	Chheavhouy Chhan	4–0, 4–0, 4–1, 4–1, 5–3
Rena Temma / Kiho Miyamae	5–0	Mariyan Meth / Sokhoeun Yean	5–0, 6–4, 7–5, 4–0, 4–0, 4–0

18 September	Pakistan	0–3	South Korea

Fizza Ali / Tahreem Naushad	0–5	Eom Ye-jin / Kim Yeon-hwa	0–4, 0–4, 0–4, 0–4, 0–4
Kainaat Shallwani	0–4	Hwang Jung-mi	0–4, 0–4, 0–4, 1–4, 0–4
Eraj Zaidi / Sabrina Khan	0–5	Kim Han-sol / Lee Su-jin	0–5, 2–4, 1–4, 0–4, 0–4, 0–4

18 September	Cambodia	0–3	South Korea

Chanroseka Khun / Chheavhouy Chhan	0–5	Kim Han-sol / Lee Su-jin	0–4, 2–4, 2–4, 1–4, 1–4, 3–5
Mariyan Meth	1–4	Hwang Jung-mi	1–4, 1–4, 5–3, 4–6, 0–4, 1–4
Chankanha Chhorn / Sokhoeun Yean	2–5	Eom Ye-jin / Kim Yeon-hwa	1–5, 0–4, 1–4, 0–4, 0–4, 4–0, 2–4

18 September	Japan	3–0	Pakistan

Rio Maeda / Sakura Nakatani	5–0	Eraj Zaidi / Sabrina Khan	4–0, 4–0, 4–1, 4–0, 4–0, 4–0
Iwakura Ayaka	4–0	Kainaat Shallwani	4–0, 4–0, 4–0, 4–0, 4–0
Rena Temma / Kiho Miyamae	5–0	Fizza Ali / Tahreem Naushad	5–0, 4–0, 4–0, 4–0, 4–0, 1–4

18 September	Japan	3–0	South Korea

Rena Temma / Kiho Miyamae	5–0	Kim Han-sol / Kim Yeon-hwa	5–0, 4–0, 7–5, 4–2, 5–3, 4–2
Iwakura Ayaka	4–1	Lee Su-jin	4–1, 3–5, 4–1, 4–0, 4–1, 5–3
Rio Maeda / Sakura Nakatani	5–0	Eom Ye-jin / Hwang Jung-mi	5–0, 4–2, 4–0, 4–1, 4–2, 4–2

18 September	Cambodia	3–0	Pakistan

Chanroseka Khun / Chheavhouy Chhan	5–0	Fizza Ali / Tahreem Naushad	5–0, 4–2, 4–1, 4–0, 4–0, 4–0
Mariyan Meth	4–0	Eraj Zaidi	4–0, 4–1, 4–0, 4–1, 4–1
Chankanha Chhorn / Sokhoeun Yean	5–0	Kainaat Shallwani / Sabrina Khan	5–0, 5–3, 4–0, 4–1, 4–0, 5–3

==== Group B ====
Pos	Team	Pld	W	L	MF	MA	MD	Qualification
1	Chinese Taipei	3	3	0	9	0	+9	Semifinals
2	Philippines	3	2	1	5	4	+1	Semifinals
3	Thailand	3	1	2	4	5	−1	
4	Mongolia	3	0	3	0	9	−9	

Source: 20th Asian Games Aichi-Nagoya 2026

18 September	Chinese Taipei	3–0	Thailand

Chou Yen-chen / Chiang Min-yu	5–2	Chatcha Klomkamol / Praewa Jongjit	4–1, 4–2, 4–1, 2–4, 4–0, 4–1, 6–4
Lo Shu-ting	4–1	Thanpitcha Somsanit	4–1, 4–1, 2–4, 4–0, 4–0, 4–2
Hsu Chiao-ying / Huang Shih-yuan	5–0	Buntita Phoungprapa / Alisha Ziegler	5–0, 4–1, 4–2, 4–1, 4–1, 4–1

18 September	Mongolia	0–3	Philippines

Khongorzul Ganbold / Enkhjin Amarjargal	0–5	Princess Catindig / Noelle Manalac	0–4, 0–4, 1–4, 2–4, 2–4, 2–4
Enkhkhuslen Ganbaatar	0–4	Christy Sanosa	0–4, 1–4, 1–4, 3–5, 4–6
Namuunkhuslen Erdembileg / Anu-ujin Gantur	0–5	Shyryn Salazar / Hilary Paas	0–5, 3–5, 0–4, 2–4, 2–4, 0–4

18 September	Chinese Taipei	3–0	Mongolia

Hsu Chiao-ying / Huang Shih-yuan	5–0	Enkhkhuslen Ganbaatar / Enkhjin Amarjargal	5–0, 4–0, 4–0, 4–1, 4–0, 4–0
Lo Shu-ting	4–0	Anu-ujin Gantur	4–0, 4–0, 4–0, 4–1, 4–0
Chou Yen-chen / Chiang Min-yu	5–0	Khongorzul Ganbold / Namuunkhuslen Erdembileg	5–0, 4–2, 4–1, 5–3, 4–2, 4–0

18 September	Thailand	1–2	Philippines

Thanpitcha Somsanit / Praewa Jongjit	2–5	Princess Catindig / Noelle Manalac	2–5, 4–6, 4–6, 6–4, 4–2, 1–4, 4–6, 6–8
Chatcha Klomkamol	0–4	Christy Sanosa	0–4, 0–4, 1–4, 4–6, 0–4
Buntita Phoungprapa / Alisha Ziegler	5–2	Shyryn Salazar / Hilary Paas	5–3, 4–2, 4–2, 4–0, 12–10, 1–4, 3–5, 0–4, 4–1

18 September	Chinese Taipei	3–0	Philippines

Hsu Chiao-ying / Huang Shih-yuan	5–0	Shyryn Salazar / Hilary Paas	5–0, 4–1, 4–1, 4–1, 4–0, 4–2
Chiang Min-yu	4–1	Christy Sanosa	4–1, 4–1, 4–0, 6–4, 3–5, 5–3
Chou Yen-chen / Lo Shu-ting	5–0	Princess Catindig / Noelle Manalac	5–0, 4–1, 4–2, 4–2, 4–2, 4–2

18 September	Thailand	3–0	Mongolia

Thanpitcha Somsanit / Alisha Ziegler	5–0	Anu-ujin Gantur / Enkhjin Amarjargal	5–0, 4–2, 4–1, 6–4, 7–5, 4–0
Chatcha Klomkamol	4–1	Namuunkhuslen Erdembileg	4–1, 5–3, 4–6, 4–1, 4–1, 5–3
Praewa Jongjit / Buntita Phoungprapa	5–2	Khongorzul Ganbold / Enkhkhuslen Ganbaatar	5–3, 4–2, 2–4, 4–2, 1–4, 4–2, 2–4, 4–1, 4–0

=== Knockout round ===
Semifinals
A1	Japan	2
B2	Philippines	0
A2	South Korea	1
B1	Chinese Taipei	2

Final
A1	Japan	2
B1	Chinese Taipei	1

==== Semifinals ====
20 September	Japan	2–0	Philippines

Rena Temma / Kiho Miyamae	5–0	Princess Catindig / Noelle Manalac	5–0, 4–0, 4–1, 4–2, 4–0, 4–1
Iwakura Ayaka	4–0	Christy Sanosa	4–0, 4–0, 4–1, 4–2, 4–2

20 September	South Korea	1–2	Chinese Taipei

Lee Su-jin / Kim Han-sol	4–5	Hsu Chiao-ying / Huang Shih-yuan	4–5, 1–4, 4–0, 1–4, 4–2, 0–4, 4–1, 0–4, 6–4, 3–7
Hwang Jung-mi	4–3	Chiang Min-yu	4–3, 2–4, 6–4, 4–2, 0–4, 2–4, 4–2, 11–9
Eom Ye-jin / Kim Yeon-hwa	4–5	Chou Yen-chen / Lo Shu-ting	4–5, 2–4, 5–7, 4–1, 8–6, 4–2, 2–4, 2–4, 5–3, 2–7

==== Final ====
20 September	Japan	2–1	Chinese Taipei

Rena Temma / Kiho Miyamae	5–0	Hsu Chiao-ying / Huang Shih-yuan	5–0, 4–1, 4–1, 4–1, 4–1, 4–2
Iwakura Ayaka	1–4	Chiang Min-yu	1–4, 3–5, 4–2, 3–5, 2–4, 0–4
Rio Maeda / Sakura Nakatani	5–0	Chou Yen-chen / Lo Shu-ting	5–0, 4–2, 4–2, 4–2, 4–1, 4–1
