= Soft tennis at the 2026 Asian Games – Women's singles =

Women's singles at the 2026 Asian Games
- Venue: Higashiyama Park Tennis Center
- Dates: 22–23 September 2026
- Competitors: 23 from 12 nations

Medalists
gold medal	Rena Temma	Japan
silver medal	Ri Jin-mi	North Korea
bronze medal	Ri So-hyang	North Korea
bronze medal	Kiho Miyamae	Japan

The women's singles soft tennis event is part of the soft tennis programme and took place from 22 to 23 September 2026, at the Higashiyama Park Tennis Center, in Nagoya, Aichi Prefecture.

== Schedule ==
All times are Japan Standard Time (UTC+09:00)

Date	Time	Event
Tuesday, 22 September 2026	09:00	Preliminary round
Wednesday, 23 September 2026	09:00	Quarterfinals
Wednesday, 23 September 2026	10:30	Semifinals
Wednesday, 23 September 2026	13:30	Final

== Results ==
=== Preliminary round ===
==== Group A ====
Pos	Player	Pld	W	L	GF	GA	GD	Qualification
1	Rena Temma (JPN)	2	2	0	8	0	+8	Quarterfinals
2	Namuunkhuslen Erdenbileg (MGL)	2	1	1	4	4	0	
3	Georgia Chaudhary (NEP)	2	0	2	0	8	−8	

Source: AG2026

	Score		Game						
	Score		1	2	3	4	5	6	7
Rena Temma (JPN)	4–0	Georgia Chaudhary (NEP)	4–0	4–1	4–0	4–0			
Georgia Chaudhary (NEP)	0–4	Namuunkhuslen Erdenbileg (MGL)	2–4	0–4	2–4	1–4			
Rena Temma (JPN)	4–0	Namuunkhuslen Erdenbileg (MGL)	4–0	4–0	4–0	4–0			

==== Group B ====
Pos	Player	Pld	W	L	GF	GA	GD	Qualification
1	Lee Su-jin (KOR)	2	2	0	8	2	+6	Quarterfinals
2	Huang Shih-yuan (TPE)	2	1	1	6	4	+2	
3	Mariyan Meth (CAM)	2	0	2	0	8	−8	

Source: AG2026

	Score		Game						
	Score		1	2	3	4	5	6	7
Lee Su-jin (KOR)	4–0	Mariyan Meth (CAM)	4–1	4–1	4–0	4–0			
Mariyan Meth (CAM)	0–4	Huang Shih-yuan (TPE)	0–4	2–4	0–4	1–4			
Lee Su-jin (KOR)	4–2	Huang Shih-yuan (TPE)	2–4	4–1	4–2	4–2	3–5	4–0	

==== Group C ====
Pos	Player	Pld	W	L	GF	GA	GD	Qualification
1	Ri So-hyang (PRK)	2	2	0	8	2	+6	Quarterfinals
2	Allif Nafiiyah (INA)	2	1	1	5	5	0	
3	Princess Catindig (PHI)	2	0	2	2	8	−6	

Source: AG2026

	Score		Game						
	Score		1	2	3	4	5	6	7
Princess Catindig (PHI)	1–4	Allif Nafiiyah (INA)	4–0	1–4	1–4	3–5	0–4		
Allif Nafiiyah (INA)	1–4	Ri So-hyang (PRK)	2–4	4–0	2–4	1–4	2–4		
Princess Catindig (PHI)	1–4	Ri So-hyang (PRK)	1–4	5–3	1–4	0–4	2–4		

==== Group D ====
Pos	Player	Pld	W	L	GF	GA	GD	Qualification
1	Alisha Ziegler (THA)	2	2	0	8	1	+7	Quarterfinals
2	Aadhya Tiwari (IND)	2	1	1	5	4	+1	
3	Kainaat Shallwani (PAK)	2	0	2	0	8	−8	

Source: AG2026

	Score		Game						
	Score		1	2	3	4	5	6	7
Aadhya Tiwari (IND)	1–4	Alisha Ziegler (THA)	4–1	0–4	0–4	2–4	4–6		
Alisha Ziegler (THA)	4–0	Kainaat Shallwani (PAK)	4–0	4–1	4–1	4–2			
Aadhya Tiwari (IND)	4–0	Kainaat Shallwani (PAK)	4–2	5–3	4–1	5–3			

==== Group E ====
Pos	Player	Pld	W	L	GF	GA	GD	Qualification
1	Chiang Min-yu (TPE)	2	2	0	8	1	+7	Quarterfinals
2	Siti Arasy (INA)	2	1	1	5	5	0	
3	Chheavhouy Chhan (CAM)	2	0	2	1	8	−7	

Source: AG2026

	Score		Game						
	Score		1	2	3	4	5	6	7
Chiang Min-yu (TPE)	4–0	Chheavhouy Chhan (CAM)	7–5	4–2	4–1	4–1			
Chheavhouy Chhan (CAM)	1–4	Siti Arasy (INA)	0–4	1–4	5–7	7–5	3–5		
Chiang Min-yu (TPE)	4–1	Siti Arasy (INA)	4–6	4–0	4–1	4–0	4–0		

==== Group F ====
Pos	Player	Pld	W	L	GF	GA	GD	Qualification
1	Kiho Miyamae (JPN)	2	2	0	8	1	+7	Quarterfinals
2	Christy Sanosa (PHI)	2	1	1	5	4	+1	
3	Eraj Zaidi (PAK)	2	0	2	0	8	−8	

Source: AG2026

	Score		Game						
	Score		1	2	3	4	5	6	7
Kiho Miyamae (JPN)	4–0	Eraj Zaidi (PAK)	4–0	4–2	4–1	4–0			
Eraj Zaidi (PAK)	0–4	Christy Sanosa (PHI)	0–4	2–4	1–4	0–4			
Kiho Miyamae (JPN)	4–1	Christy Sanosa (PHI)	3–5	4–1	7–5	4–1	4–1		

==== Group G ====
Pos	Player	Pld	W	L	GF	GA	GD	Qualification
1	Ri Jin-mi (PRK)	1	1	0	4	0	+4	Quarterfinals
2	Anu-ujin Gantur (MGL)	1	0	1	0	4	−4	

Source: AG2026

	Score		Game						
	Score		1	2	3	4	5	6	7
Ri Jin-mi (PRK)	4–0	Anu-ujin Gantur (MGL)	4–0	4–0	4–0	4–2			

==== Group H ====
Pos	Player	Pld	W	L	GF	GA	GD	Qualification
1	Hwang Jeong-mi (KOR)	2	2	0	8	0	+8	Quarterfinals
2	Chatcha Klomkamol (THA)	2	1	1	4	5	−1	
3	Souvananh Hacnolath (LAO)	2	0	2	1	8	−7	

Source: AG2026

	Score		Game						
	Score		1	2	3	4	5	6	7
Hwang Jeong-mi (KOR)	4–0	Souvananh Hacnolath (LAO)	4–1	4–0	4–0	4–1			
Souvananh Hacnolath (LAO)	1–4	Chatcha Klomkamol (THA)	0–4	4–6	4–2	3–5	2–4		
Hwang Jeong-mi (KOR)	4–0	Chatcha Klomkamol (THA)	5–3	8–6	6–4	4–2			

=== Knockout round ===
Quarterfinals
A1	Rena Temma (JPN)	4	4	4	2	2	4
B1	Lee Su-jin (KOR)	1	0	2	4	4	2
C1	Ri So-hyang (PRK)	4	5	4	0	4	4
D1	Alisha Ziegler (THA)	0	3	0	4	6	1
E1	Chiang Min-yu (TPE)	2	8	8	2	1	1
F1	Kiho Miyamae (JPN)	4	6	6	4	4	4
G1	Ri Jin-mi (PRK)	4	4	1	0	5	4
H1	Hwang Jeong-mi (KOR)	1	2	4	4	3	2

Semifinals
A1	Rena Temma (JPN)	4	4	6	4
C1	Ri So-hyang (PRK)	1	0	4	1
F1	Kiho Miyamae (JPN)	3	1	2	3
G1	Ri Jin-mi (PRK)	5	4	4	5

Final
A1	Rena Temma (JPN)	4	4	1	1	4	4	7
G1	Ri Jin-mi (PRK)	1	2	4	4	0	6	1
