= Sakura Nakatani =

Japanese soft tennis player (born 2006)

Personal information
- Native name: 中谷 さくら
- Nationality: Japanese
- Born: 6 March 2006 (age 20) Hyogo Prefecture, Japan

Sport
- Country: Japan
- Sport: Soft tennis
- Position: Front player
- Club: Meiji University
Medal record
Women's soft tennis
Representing Japan
Asian Games
| Gold medal – first place | 2026 Aichi-Nagoya | Team |
Asian Soft Tennis Championships
| Gold medal – first place | 2025 | Women's doubles |
| Gold medal – first place | 2025 | Team |

Sakura Nakatani (Japanese: 中谷 さくら; born 6 March 2006) is a Japanese soft tennis player who competes as a front player. She represents Meiji University and has been a member of the Japanese national team. She won gold in the women's team event at the 2026 Asian Games in Aichi and Nagoya, Japan. She also won the women's doubles and team titles at the 2025 Asian Soft Tennis Championships, partnering with Rio Maeda in the doubles event.

== Career ==
Nakatani was born in Hyogo Prefecture and attended Akashi Junior High School and Suma Gakuen High School before entering Meiji University. She plays primarily as a front player and receiver.

While at Suma Gakuen High School, Nakatani formed a successful doubles partnership with Rio Maeda. The pair won the women's doubles title at the National High School Comprehensive Athletic Meet in 2023.

After entering Meiji University, Nakatani continued her partnership with Maeda. In December 2024, the pair won the All Japan Student Indoor Championships. At the 2024 All Japan Intercollegiate Championships, Nakatani won silver in women's singles, while she and Maeda finished as runners-up in women's doubles.

In April 2025, Nakatani and Maeda won the Japanese qualifying tournament for the 2025 Asian Soft Tennis Championships, securing their places on the Japanese national team.

At the 2025 Asian Soft Tennis Championships in South Korea, Nakatani and Maeda won the women's doubles title, defeating their opponents in the final to claim their first international individual title. Nakatani also helped Japan win the women's team event.

In 2026, Nakatani and Maeda continued to win domestic titles. They won the women's doubles title at the 2026 All Japan Intercollegiate Championships.

Nakatani was selected to represent Japan at the 2026 Asian Games in Aichi and Nagoya. She competed in the women's team event, where Japan won the gold medal.
