= Sailing at the 2026 Asian Games – 420 =

420 at the 2026 Asian Games
- Venue: Kaiyoh Yacht Harbor
- Date: 28 September – 3 October 2026
- Competitors: 12 from 6 nations

Medalists
gold medal	Misaki Tsunomori; Riho Sanematsu	Japan
silver medal	Pitipoom Jaroenpon; Worrakan Saksriklom	Thailand
bronze medal	Choi Gae-un; Kim Tae-rin	South Korea

The mixed 420 competition at the 2026 Asian Games was held from 28 September – 3 October 2026 at Kaiyoh Yacht Harbor in Gamagōri, Aichi, Japan.

Misaki Tsunomori and Riho Sanematsu won the gold medal, Pitipoom Jaroenpon and Worrakan Saksriklom took silver and Choi Gae-un and Kim Tae-rin bronze.

== Schedule ==
All times are Japan Standard Time (UTC+09:00).

Date	Time	Event
Monday, 28 September 2026	12:10	Race 1–3
Tuesday, 29 September 2026	11:00	Race 4–5
Thursday, 1 October 2026	11:10	Race 6–8
Friday, 2 October 2026	10:40	Race 9–10
Saturday, 3 October 2026	10:30	Race 11–12

== Results ==
Legend

- DSQ — Disqualification
- UFD — U flag disqualification

Rank	Team	Race												Total	Net
Rank	Team	1	2	3	4	5	6	7	8	9	10	11	12	Total	Net
1st place, gold medalist(s)	Japan (JPN); Misaki Tsunomori; Riho Sanematsu	1	~~(3)~~	1	1	2	1	1	1	~~(5)~~	2	1	1	20	12
2nd place, silver medalist(s)	Thailand (THA); Pitipoom Jaroenpon; Worrakan Saksriklom	2	1	~~(6)~~	2	4	2	2	4	4	~~(5)~~	2	2	36	25
3rd place, bronze medalist(s)	South Korea (KOR); Choi Gae-un; Kim Tae-rin	~~(7)~~; DSQ	5	2	5	1	~~(7)~~; DSQ	5	2	1	1	5	4	45	31
4	Malaysia (MAS); Danyal Marczqui Rahmat Haron Muzaffar; Nur Aina Norhazram	3	2	5	~~(6)~~	5	3	6	3	2	3	~~(7)~~; UFD	6	51	38
5	Singapore (SGP); Ethan Chia; Ashlea Tham	4	~~(6)~~	3	4	~~(6)~~	5	3	5	3	4	4	3	50	38
6	Philippines (PHI); Ronello Castillo; Khim Ashley Albo	5	4	4	3	3	4	4	~~(6)~~	~~(6)~~	6	3	5	53	41
