= Ayaka Iwakura =

Japanese soft tennis player (born 2002)

Personal information
- Native name: 岩倉 彩佳
- Nationality: Japanese
- Born: 22 August 2002 (age 24) Oita Prefecture, Japan

Sport
- Country: Japan
- Sport: Soft tennis
- Position: Back player
- Club: Donguri Kitahiroshima
Medal record
Women's soft tennis
Representing Japan
Asian Games
Gold medal – first place	2026 Aichi-Nagoya	Team
Asian Soft Tennis Championships
Gold medal – first place	2025	Team
Bronze medal – third place	2025	Women's singles

Ayaka Iwakura (Japanese: 岩倉 彩佳; born 22 August 2002) is a Japanese soft tennis player. She represents Donguri Kitahiroshima and competes primarily in women's doubles and singles. She won the gold medal in the women's team event at the 2026 Asian Games in Aichi and Nagoya, Japan. She also won the women's singles bronze medal and was part of the Japanese team that won gold at the 2025 Asian Soft Tennis Championships.

== Career ==
Iwakura was born on 22 August 2002 and attended Meiho High School in Oita Prefecture. She later joined Donguri Kitahiroshima, where she established herself as one of the leading Japanese women's soft tennis players.

Iwakura achieved success in domestic competition during the early 2020s. In 2023, she won the women's doubles title at the West Japan Soft Tennis Championships. In 2024, she and Noa Takahashi won the women's doubles title at the West Japan Championships and were selected for major national competitions.

In 2025, Iwakura formed a successful partnership with Shinobu Takahashi. The pair won the women's doubles title at the All Japan Soft Tennis Championships, defeating Mika Tenma and Tomomi Sakon in the final. Iwakura also represented Japan at the 2025 Asian Soft Tennis Championships in India, where she won the bronze medal in women's singles and helped Japan win the women's team title.

In March 2026, Iwakura competed in the Japanese selection tournament for the 2026 Asian Games. She qualified for the national team after reaching the final stages of the selection competition. In April, she and Takahashi won the women's doubles title at the All Japan Women's Selected Soft Tennis Championships.

At the 2026 Asian Games in Aichi and Nagoya, Iwakura represented Japan in the women's team event. In the final against Chinese Taipei, she played the singles match. Although she lost her match, Japan won the tie 2–1 after victories in the two doubles matches, giving Iwakura an Asian Games gold medal.
