= Rena Temma =

Japanese soft tennis player (born 2007)

Personal information
- Native name: 天間 麗奈
- Nationality: Japanese
- Born: 11 September 2007 (age 19) Tohoku, Aomori, Japan

Sport
- Country: Japan
- Sport: Soft tennis
- Position: Back player
- Club: Nippon Sport Science University
Medal record
Women's soft tennis
Representing Japan
Asian Games
| Gold medal – first place | 2026 Aichi-Nagoya | Women's singles |
| Gold medal – first place | 2026 Aichi-Nagoya | Team |
| Silver medal – second place | 2026 Aichi-Nagoya | Mixed doubles |
Asian Soft Tennis Championships
| Gold medal – first place | 2025 Mungyeong | Women's singles |
| Gold medal – first place | 2025 Mungyeong | Team |
| Silver medal – second place | 2025 Mungyeong | Mixed doubles |
World Soft Tennis Championships
| Silver medal – second place | 2024 Anyang | Team |
World Junior Soft Tennis Championships
| Gold medal – first place | 2024 Jingshan | U18 singles |
| Gold medal – first place | 2024 Jingshan | U18 doubles |
| Gold medal – first place | 2024 Jingshan | U18 team |

Rena Temma (Japanese: 天間 麗奈; born 11 September 2007) is a Japanese soft tennis player who competes in women's singles, doubles and team events. She represents Nippon Sport Science University. She won three medals at the 2026 Asian Games in Aichi and Nagoya, winning gold in the women's singles and team events and silver in mixed doubles. She also won the women's singles title at the 2025 Asian Soft Tennis Championships and was part of the Japanese team that won the team event.

== Career ==
Temma was born on 11 September 2007 and attended Tohoku High School in Sendai, Japan. She later entered Nippon Sport Science University.

In 2023, while attending Tohoku High School, Temma won the U17 women's doubles title at the JOC Cup All Japan Junior Soft Tennis Championships.

In May 2024, Temma won the women's singles title at the All Japan Singles Soft Tennis Championships. At the age of 16, she became the youngest winner in the history of the competition. Later that year, she won the women's doubles title at the All Japan Soft Tennis Championships with Kiho Miyamae.

At the 2024 World Soft Tennis Championships in Anyang, South Korea, Temma reached the round of 16 in women's singles and helped Japan win the silver medal in the women's team event. In November 2024, she won three gold medals at the World Junior Soft Tennis Championships in Jingshan, China, taking the U18 women's singles, doubles and team titles.

In 2025, Temma won the women's singles title at the 2025 Asian Soft Tennis Championships in Mungyeong, South Korea. She also won the women's team gold medal and the mixed doubles silver medal with Kaito Maruyama.

In June 2026, Temma won the All Japan Mixed Doubles Championships with Takumi Kurosaka, successfully defending the title she had won the previous year.

At the 2026 Asian Games in Aichi and Nagoya, Temma won gold in the women's team event. She then won silver in mixed doubles with Kaito Maruyama. In the women's singles final, she defeated North Korea's Ri Jin-mi 4–3 in the deciding game to win the gold medal. She became one of Japan's three-medal winners in soft tennis at the Games.
