= Kim Min-kyu =

Kim Min-gyu or Kim Min-kyu (Korean: 김민규; RR: Gim Mingyu) may refer to:

== Entertainers ==
- Kim Min Gue (born 1994), South Korean actor
- Mingyu (born Kim Mingyu, 1997), South Korean singer and rapper, member of Seventeen
- Kim Min-kyu (entertainer) (born 2001), South Korean singer and model

== Sportspeople ==
- Kim Min-gyu (table tennis) (1977–2017), South Korean para table tennis player
- Kim Min-gyu (judoka) (born 1982), South Korean judoka
- Kim Min-kyu (luger) (born 1983), South Korean luger
- Kim Min-kyu (fencer) (born 1990), South Korean foil fencer
- Kim Min-gyu (baseball) (born 1999), South Korean baseball player
- Kim Min-kyu (golfer) (born 2001), South Korean golfer
- Kim Min-kyu (footballer, born 1993), South Korean footballer for Changwon Citizen
- Kim Min-kyu (footballer, born 1998), South Korean footballer for Seoul E-Land
- Kim Min-kyu (footballer, born 2000), South Korean footballer

== See also ==
- Kim (Korean surname)
- List of people with the Korean family name Kim
- Min-kyu
