= Soft tennis at the 2026 Asian Games – Men's team =

Men's team at the 2026 Asian Games
- Venue: Higashiyama Park Tennis Center
- Location: Nagoya, Aichi Prefecture, Japan
- Dates: 18–20 September 2026
- Competitors: 53 from 11 nations

Medalists
gold medal	Japan; Takuya Kurosaka; Kaito Maruyama; Takafumi Uchimoto; Toshiki Uematsu; Sora Hirooka
silver medal	Chinese Taipei; Yu Kai-wen; Lin Wei-chieh; Chen Po-yi; Chen Yu-hsun; Chang Yu-sung
bronze medal	Indonesia; Muhammad Reza Falevi; Tio Juliandi Hutauruk; Rizky Laluyan; Bagus Angga Boedy Pradewa; Fernando Sanger
bronze medal	South Korea; Kim Jin-woong; Lee Hyung-won; Park Jae-kyu; Kim Hyun-soo; Lee Ha-neul

The men's team soft tennis event is part of the soft tennis programme and is taking place on 18 until 20 September 2026, at the Higashiyama Park Tennis Center, in Nagoya, Aichi Prefecture.

== Schedule ==
All times are Japan Standard Time (UTC+09:00)

Date	Time	Event
Friday, 18 September 2026	09:00	Preliminary round
Friday, 18 September 2026	15:00	Quarterfinals
Sunday, 20 September 2026	11:30	Semifinals
Sunday, 20 September 2026	17:15	Final

== Results ==
=== Preliminary round ===
==== Group A ====
Pos	Team	Pld	W	L	MF	MA	MD	Qualification
1	Japan	3	3	0	9	0	+9	Quarterfinals
2	Philippines	3	2	1	6	3	+3	Quarterfinals
3	Cambodia	3	1	2	3	6	−3	
4	Pakistan	3	0	3	0	9	−9	

Source: 20th Asian Games Aichi-Nagoya 2026

18 September	Japan	3–0	Cambodia

Takafumi Uchimoto / Sora Hirooka	5–0	Kan Sophorn / Yi Keavirak	4–0, 4–2, 4–1, 4–1, 5–3
Toshiki Uematsu	4–0	Chao Viva	5–3, 4–2, 4–1, 4–2
Takuya Kurosaka / Kaito Maruyama	5–0	Doeum Samsocheaphearun / Soy Sothun	4–1, 4–0, 4–0, 4–1, 4–0

18 September	Philippines	3–0	Pakistan

Joseph Arcilla / Samuel Nuguit	5–0	Muhammad Ali / Hamza Arain	4–1, 4–1, 4–0, 4–1, 4–2
Sherwin Nuguit	4–0	Hussain Arain	4–1, 4–0, 4–1, 4–2
Mark Alcoseba / Dheo Talatayod	5–1	Rafae Bashir / Rayyan Khan	4–1, 4–2, 4–1, 4–0, 1–4, 4–0

18 September	Japan	3–0	Philippines

Takafumi Uchimoto / Takuya Kurosaka	5–0	Joseph Arcilla / Samuel Nuguit	4–2, 5–3, 4–1, 7–5, 4–2
Toshiki Uematsu	4–0	Sherwin Nuguit	4–1, 4–1, 4–0, 4–1
Sora Hirooka / Kaito Maruyama	5–0	Mark Alcoseba / Dheo Talatayod	4–2, 5–3, 5–3, 5–3, 6–4

18 September	Cambodia	3–0	Pakistan

Kan Sophorn / Yi Keavirak	5–1	Muhammad Ali / Hamza Arain	4–0, 2–4, 4–0, 4–0, 6–4, 4–2
Chao Viva	4–0	Hussain Arain	4–1, 4–2, 4–1, 4–0
Doeum Samsocheaphearun / Soy Sothun	5–0	Rafae Bashir / Rayyan Khan	4–1, 4–0, 4–0, 4–2, 4–0

18 September	Japan	3–0	Pakistan

Sora Hirooka / Kaito Maruyama	5–0	Rafae Bashir / Rayyan Khan	4–0, 4–0, 4–0, 4–0, 5–3
Takuya Kurosaka	4–0	Hussain Arain	4–1, 4–1, 4–2, 4–0
Takafumi Uchimoto / Toshiki Uematsu	5–0	Muhammad Ali / Hamza Arain	4–0, 4–0, 4–0, 4–0, 4–0

18 September	Cambodia	0–3	Philippines

Kan Sophorn / Yi Keavirak	0–5	Joseph Arcilla / Samuel Nuguit	0–4, 2–4, 4–6, 1–4, 0–4
Doeum Samsocheaphearun	2–4	Sherwin Nuguit	2–4, 3–5, 4–2, 2–4, 4–0, 3–5
Chao Viva / Soy Sothun	1–5	Mark Alcoseba / Dheo Talatayod	0–4, 1–4, 3–5, 2–4, 4–2, 4–6

==== Group B ====
Pos	Team	Pld	W	L	MF	MA	MD	Qualification
1	South Korea	2	2	0	5	1	+4	Quarterfinals
2	Indonesia	2	1	1	4	2	+2	Quarterfinals
3	Nepal	2	0	2	0	6	−6	

Source: 20th Asian Games Aichi-Nagoya 2026

18 September	South Korea	3–0	Nepal

Lee Hyung-won / Park Jae-kyu	5–0	Kamal Bhandari / Pradip Khatri	4–0, 4–1, 4–2, 6–4, 4–1
Kim Jin-woong	4–0	Brijesh Pandey	4–2, 4–0, 4–1, 4–2
Kim Hyun-soo / Lee Han-eul	3–0	Bye	Cancelled

18 September	Nepal	0–3	Indonesia

Pradip Khatri / Brijesh Pandey	0–5	Tio Hutauruk / Fernando Sanger	1–4, 2–4, 0–4, 1–4, 2–4
Kamal Bhandari	0–4	Bagus Pradewa	2–4, 1–4, 1–4, 4–6
Bye	0–5	Rizky Laluyan / Muhammad Falevi	Cancelled

18 September	South Korea	2–1	Indonesia

Kim Hyun-soo / Lee Han-eul	5–2	Rizky Laluyan / Muhammad Falevi	2–4, 4–1, 4–2, 4–0, 3–5, 4–1, 4–0
Kim Jin-woong	4–0	Bagus Pradewa	4–0, 4–0, 4–1, 5–3
Lee Hyung-won / Park Jae-kyu	RET–W	Tio Hutauruk / Fernando Sanger	4–2, 4–0, 2–4, 2–4, 5–3, 0–0

==== Group C ====
Pos	Team	Pld	W	L	MF	MA	MD	Qualification
1	Chinese Taipei	3	3	0	9	0	+9	Quarterfinals
2	India	3	2	1	6	3	+3	Quarterfinals
3	Laos	3	1	2	2	7	−5	
4	Mongolia	3	0	3	1	8	−7	

Source: 20th Asian Games Aichi-Nagoya 2026

18 September	Chinese Taipei	3–0	Mongolia

Chen Yu-hsun / Chang Yu-sung	5–0	Bold-erdene Altangerel / Bud Nyamdorj	4–0, 4–1, 4–0, 4–0, 4–1
Chen Po-yi	4–0	Munkhtulga Bataa	3–2, 5–3, 4–0, 7–5
Yu Kai-wen / Lin Wei-chieh	5–0	Khaliunbayar Khurelbayar / Ulsbold Enkhbayar	4–1, 4–1, 4–0, 4–0, 4–1

18 September	India	3–0	Laos

Jay Meena / Yogesh Choudhary	5–0	Sataporn Simmalavong / Phatthana Louangsisombath	4–2, 4–0, 4–2, 4–1, 4–1
Aryan Thakur	4–0	Bekki Vongphakdy	4–0, 4–2, 7–5, 4–0
Aniket Patel / Om Yadav	5–1	Senthanongvath Pasomsouk / Viengthong Phienvihane	4–1, 4–1, 4–2, 7–5, 4–2

Chinese Taipei	3–0	India

Yu Kai-wen / Lin Wei-chieh	5–0	Jay Meena / Yogesh Choudhary	4–2, 4–1, 4–2, 4–1, 5–3
Chang Yu-sung	4–1	Aryan Thakur	4–1, 5–3, 5–3, 2–4, 4–1
Chen Po-yi / Chen Yu-hsun	5–1	Aniket Patel / Om Yadav	4–0, 2–4, 4–1, 4–1, 4–2, 4–2

18 September	Mongolia	1–2	Laos

Bold-erdene Altangerel / Munkhtulga Bataa	0–5	Sataporn Simmalavong / Phatthana Louangsisombath	2–4, 1–4, 1–4, 1–4, 3–5
Ulsbold Enkhbayar	4–0	Senthanongvath Pasomsouk	4–2, 4–1, 5–3, 4–1
Khaliunbayar Khurelbayar / Bud Nyamdorj	3–5	Viengthong Phienvihane / Bekki Vongphakdy	1–4, 4–2, 3–5, 5–3, 4–2, 0–4, 3-5, 2-4

18 September	Mongolia	0–3	India

Bud Nyamdorj / Khaliunbayar Khurelbayar	0–5	Om Yadav / Aniket Patel	2–4, 1–4, 0–4, 1–4, 0–4
Munkhtulga Bataa	0–4	Jay Meena	0–4, 3–5, 2–4, 2–4
Bold-erdene Altangerel / Ulsbold Enkhbayar	1–5	Aryan Thakur / Yogesh Choudhary	3–5, 1–4, 4–2, 1–4, 0-4, 4–6

18 September	Chinese Taipei	3–0	Laos

Yu Kai-wen / Lin Wei-chieh	5–0	Sataporn Simmalavong / Phatthana Louangsisombath	4–1, 4–0, 4–0, 4–1, 4–3
Chen Po-yi	4–0	Viengthong Phienvihane	4–0, 4–1, 4–1, 4–0
Chen Yu-hsun / Chang Yu-sung	5–0	Senthanongvath Pasomsouk / Bekki Vongphakdy	4–1, 4–1, 4–1, 4–0, 4–0

=== Knockout round ===
Quarterfinals			Semifinals			Final
			A1	Japan	2
C2	India	0	B2	Indonesia	0
B2	Indonesia	2				A1	Japan	2
B1	South Korea	2				C1	Chinese Taipei	0
A2	Philippines	0	B1	South Korea	1
			C1	Chinese Taipei	2

==== Quarterfinals ====
18 September	India	0–2	Indonesia

Jay Meena / Yogesh Choudhary	2–5	Tio Hutauruk / Fernando Sanger	2–4, 0–4, 0–4, 4–1, 4–1, 1–4, 2–4
Aryan Thakur	3–4	Bagus Pradewa	2–4, 4–0, 6–4, 2–4, 1–4, 4-1, 2–7

18 September	South Korea	2–0	Philippines

Lee Hyung-won / Park Jae-kyu	5–2	Joseph Arcilla / Samuel Nuguit	5–3, 3–5, 5–3, 2–4, 4–2, 4–0, 4–0
Kim Jin-woong	4–0	Sherwin Nuguit	4–2, 5–3, 5–3, 4–2

==== Semifinals ====
20 September	Japan	2–0	Indonesia

Takafumi Uchimoto / Takuya Kurosaka	5–1	Tio Hutauruk / Fernando Sanger	4–1, 4–0, 6–4, 3–5, 4–0, 6–4
Toshiki Uematsu	4–0	Bagus Pradewa	4–2, 4–1, 4–2, 4–2

20 September	South Korea	1–2	Chinese Taipei

Lee Hyung-won / Park Jae-kyu	3–5	Yu Kai-wen / Lin Wei-chieh	6–4, 4–0, 1–4, 1–4, 3–5, 4–2, 1–4, 5–7
Kim Jin-woong	4–3	Chang Yu-sung	4–2, 1–4, 4–2, 4–1, 0–4, 1–4, 7–3
Kim Hyun-soo / Lee Ha-neul	0–5	Chen Po-yi / Chen Yu-hsun	2–4, 2–4, 4–6, 2–4, 1–4

==== Fianl ====
20 September	Japan	2–0	Chinese Taipei

Takafumi Uchimoto / Takuya Kurosaka	5–0	Chen Po-yi / Chen Yu-hsun	6–4, 4–2, 4–2, 4–1, 4–1
Toshiki Uematsu	4–1	Chang Yu-sung	4–2, 4–0, 0–4, 4–2, 4–1
