= Rio Maeda =

Japanese soft tennis player (born 2005)

Personal information
- Native name: 前田 梨緒
- Nationality: Japanese
- Born: November 8, 2005 (age 21) Hyogo Prefecture, Japan

Sport
- Country: Japan
- Sport: Soft tennis
- Position: Back player
- Club: Meiji University
Medal record
Women's soft tennis
Representing Japan
Asian Games
Gold medal – first place	2026 Aichi-Nagoya	Team
Bronze medal – third place	2026 Aichi-Nagoya	Mixed doubles
Asian Soft Tennis Championships
Gold medal – first place	2025	Women's doubles
Gold medal – first place	2025	Team
Bronze medal – third place	2025	Mixed doubles
World Soft Tennis Championships
Silver medal – second place	2024	Team

Rio Maeda (Japanese: 前田 梨緒; born 8 November 2005) is a Japanese soft tennis player. She represents Meiji University and plays primarily as a back player. She won the gold medal in the women's team event at the 2026 Asian Games in Aichi and Nagoya, Japan, and a bronze medal in mixed doubles. She was also part of the Japanese team that won silver at the 2024 World Soft Tennis Championships.

== Career ==
Maeda was born in Hyogo Prefecture and attended Shikama Higashi Junior High School and Suma Gakuen High School before entering Meiji University. She began achieving national-level success while competing for Suma Gakuen.

In 2022, Maeda won the women's doubles title at the High School Japan Cup. In 2023, she and Sakura Nakatani won the women's doubles title at the National High School Comprehensive Athletic Meet in Hokkaido.

After joining Meiji University, Maeda continued to compete successfully in national and international tournaments. In June 2024, she won the mixed doubles title at the All Japan Mixed Doubles Championships with Toshiki Uematsu. She and Sakura Nakatani also won the women's doubles title at the East Japan Championships in July 2024.

At the 2024 World Soft Tennis Championships in Anyang, South Korea, Maeda reached the quarter-finals of the women's singles and the round of 16 in mixed doubles with Riku Uchida. She was also part of the Japanese women's team that won the silver medal in the team event.

In April 2025, Maeda and Nakatani won the Japanese qualifying tournament for the 2025 Asian Soft Tennis Championships, earning selection for the Japanese national team. At the Asian Championships in 2025, Maeda and Nakatani won the women's doubles title, her first individual international title. Maeda also won bronze in mixed doubles and was part of the Japanese women's team that won the team title.

At the 2026 Asian Games in Aichi and Nagoya, Maeda represented Japan in the mixed doubles and team events. She and Kaito Maruyama won the bronze medal in mixed doubles. In the women's team competition, Maeda and Sakura Nakatani won their deciding match in the final against Chinese Taipei, helping Japan win the gold medal.
