= Kim Min-kyu (luger) =

South Korean luger (born 1983)

- Hangul: 김민규
- RR: Gim Mingyu
- MR: Kim Min'gyu

Kim Min-Kyu (sometimes listed as Min-Kyu Kim, born August 11, 1983) is a South Korean luger who competed from 1999 to 2006. Competing in two Winter Olympics, he earned his best finish of 29th in the men's singles event at Turin in 2006.
