= Miharu Ozawa =

Japanese BMX freestyle rider

Personal information
- Nationality: Japanese
- Born: November 2, 2009 (age 17) Gifu Prefecture, Japan

Sport
- Sport: BMX freestyle
- Event: Park
- Club: Monster Energy
Medal record
Women's BMX freestyle
Representing Japan
Asian Games
Silver medal – second place	2026 Aichi–Nagoya	Park
X Games
Gold medal – first place	2026 Sacramento	BMX park
Gold medal – first place	2026 Chiba	BMX park

Miharu Ozawa (Japanese: 小澤 美晴; born 2 November 2009) is a Japanese BMX freestyle rider who competes in the women's park discipline. She won the overall women's park title at the 2025 UCI BMX Freestyle World Cup and won silver at the women's park event at the 2026 Asian Games. She also won gold medals at the 2026 X Games events in Sacramento and Chiba.

== Career ==
Ozawa was born in Gifu Prefecture, Japan, on 2 November 2009. She became interested in BMX after watching her older brother ride and subsequently began practising the sport herself. She attended N High School in Japan while competing internationally and was part of its athlete programme. Her early career included participation in international BMX freestyle competitions and national events.

In 2024, Ozawa won the Japanese national championships in BMX freestyle park. She also achieved runner-up finishes at the UCI BMX Freestyle World Cup events in Montpellier, France, and Shanghai, China. These results established her as one of Japan's leading young riders in the women's park discipline.

In 2025, Ozawa continued her progress on the international circuit. She won the women's elite park events at the Japan Cup competitions in Hiroshima and Yokosuka and claimed the women's park title at the Asian BMX Freestyle Championships. At the UCI BMX Freestyle World Cup event in Montpellier, she finished second before winning the final round in Sakai, Japan, in November. The victory helped her secure the overall women's park title for the 2025 World Cup season, ahead of Germany's Kim Lea Müller and Australia's Natalya Diehm in the final standings.

In June 2026, Ozawa made her X Games debut at Sacramento, California, where she won the women's BMX park event with a score of 92.33 points. She followed that result with another victory at X Games Chiba in July, scoring 93.33 points. The wins gave her consecutive gold medals at the two 2026 X Games events.

Ozawa represented Japan at the 2026 Asian Games in Aichi and Nagoya, where BMX freestyle park made its Asian Games debut. In the women's final on 27 September, she earned a score of 91.20 points to finish second and win the silver medal. She had been dealing with a right ankle injury before the competition and had to abandon her first run, but produced a successful second run to move into the medal positions. Her result was reported by her school and Japanese news outlets, while the Japanese Olympic Committee recorded her Asian Games silver medal.
