= Misaki Tsunomori =

Japanese sailor

Personal information
- Nationality: Japanese
- Born: 19 August 2009 (age 17)
- Education: Kasumigaura High School

Sport
- Sport: Sailing
Medal record
Sailing
Representing Japan
Asian Games
Gold medal – first place	2026 Aichi-Nagoya	Youth mixed 420

Misaki Tsunomori (Japanese: 角森未岬; born 19 August 2009) is a Japanese sailor who competes in youth sailing. He represented Japan in the youth mixed 420 event at the 2026 Asian Games, where he won the gold medal with Riho Sanematsu.

== Career ==
Tsunomori began competing in sailing in the Optimist class and was associated with the Kaiyoh Marine Club in Gamagori, Aichi Prefecture. In 2023, he won the Ozawa Kichitaro Memorial Junior Sailing Race and finished runner-up at the JOC Junior Olympic Cup and JSAF Junior Youth Sailing Championship and the Riviera Cup East Japan Optimist Class Sailing Championship. He was selected for the Japanese national team in 2023 and competed at the Optimist World Championship in Spain.

Tsunomori later competed for Kasumigaura High School in Ibaraki Prefecture. In 2026, he competed in the 420 class and was selected to represent Japan at the 2026 Asian Games.

At the Asian Games in Aichi-Nagoya, Tsunomori competed as skipper in the youth mixed 420 event with Riho Sanematsu as crew. The Japanese pair established themselves among the leading boats during the early races. After five races, they were ranked first overall, and they retained the lead as the competition progressed.

On 3 October 2026, Tsunomori and Sanematsu won the gold medal in the youth mixed 420 event. They won eight of the 12 races, with one second-place finish, one third-place finish and one fifth-place finish, finishing well ahead of the rest of the field. The victory was Japan's first medal in the youth mixed 420 event at the Asian Games.

The pair's performance was also noted by Asian Sailing, which described the Japanese team as producing a consistently strong performance throughout the regatta to secure the gold medal in the youth mixed dinghy event.
