= Riho Sanematsu =

Japanese sailor

Personal information
- Nationality: Japanese
- Born: 19 April 2008 (age 18)
- Education: Kasumigaura High School

Sport
- Sport: Sailing
Medal record
Sailing
Representing Japan
Asian Games
Gold medal – first place	2026 Aichi-Nagoya	Youth mixed

Riho Sanematsu (Japanese: 實松莉歩; born 19 April 2008) is a Japanese sailor who competes in the 420 class. She won the gold medal in the youth mixed 420 event at the 2026 Asian Games, partnering with Misaki Tsunomori. Representing Kasumigaura High School in Ibaraki Prefecture, she has also competed in national high school sailing championships in Japan.

== Career ==
Sanematsu attended Kasumigaura High School in Ibaraki Prefecture, where she competed in sailing. In 2025, she won the girls' 420 class at the All-Japan High School Athletic Championships, partnering with Shion Suzuki.

In 2026, Sanematsu continued competing in the 420 class at high school regattas. She partnered with Misaki Tsunomori in the youth mixed 420 event at the Asian Games. During the competition, the pair established an early lead, placing first overall after the opening races and maintaining their position as the regatta progressed.

The Japanese pair remained at the top of the youth mixed 420 standings during the later stages of the regatta. By 2 October, they were leading the event after eight races.

At the 2026 Asian Games in Aichi-Nagoya, Japan, Sanematsu and Tsunomori won the gold medal in the youth mixed 420 event on 3 October. The pair won eight of the 12 races, finishing first overall and securing Japan's first medal in the event at the Asian Games.
