= Kiho Miyamae =

Japanese soft tennis player (born 2006)

Personal information
- Native name: 宮前 希帆
- Nationality: Japanese
- Born: February 3, 2006 (age 20) Fukui Prefecture, Japan
- Height: 156 cm (5 ft 1 in)

Sport
- Country: Japan
- Sport: Soft tennis
- Position: Front player
- Club: Watakyu Seimoa
Medal record
Women's soft tennis
Representing Japan
Asian Games
| Gold medal – first place | 2026 Aichi-Nagoya | Team |
| Bronze medal – third place | 2026 Aichi-Nagoya | Women's singles |
Asian Soft Tennis Championships
| Gold medal – first place | 2025 | Team |
| Bronze medal – third place | 2025 | Women's doubles |

Kiho Miyamae (Japanese: 宮前 希帆; born 3 February 2006) is a Japanese soft tennis player. She competes as a front player and represents Watakyu Seimoa. She won the gold medal in the women's team event and the bronze medal in the women's singles event at the 2026 Asian Games in Aichi and Nagoya, Japan. She was also part of the Japanese team that won the women's team title at the 2025 Asian Soft Tennis Championships.

== Career ==
Miyamae was born in Fukui Prefecture. She attended Hiroshima Shoyo High School before joining Watakyu Seimoa in December 2024. She plays primarily at the front of the court and is known for her low volley.

In 2024, Miyamae won the women's doubles title at the Emperor's Cup and Queen's Cup All Japan Soft Tennis Championships with Rena Temma. The pair defeated the defending champions in the final to claim the title.

In 2025, Miyamae won the women's singles title at the All Japan Singles Soft Tennis Championships. She also won the All Japan Indoor Championship, the West Japan Championship and the All Japan Adult Championship. At the 2025 Asian Soft Tennis Championships in India, she won the bronze medal in women's doubles and the gold medal in the women's team event.

In March 2026, Miyamae won the Japanese qualifying tournament for the 2026 Asian Games, earning selection to represent Japan at the Games in Aichi and Nagoya.

At the 2026 Asian Games, Miyamae won the gold medal in the women's team event with Japan. She also won the bronze medal in women's singles after reaching the semifinals.
