= Soft tennis at the 2026 Asian Games =

- Venue: Higashiyama Park Tennis Center
- Location: Nagoya, Aichi Prefecture, Japan
- Dates: 18–23 September 2026
- Competitors: 116 from 13 nations

The soft tennis tournaments at the 2026 Asian Games is being held between 18 and 23 September at Higashiyama Park Tennis Center.

== Schedule ==
The schedule is as follows:

P	Preliminary round	¼	Quarterfinals	½	Semifinals	F	Gold medal match

Event↓/Date →	18th Fri		19th Sat	20th Sun		21st Mon				22nd Tue	23rd Wed		
Men's singles										P	¼	½	F
Men's team	P	¼		½	F								
Women's singles										P	¼	½	F
Women's team	P	¼		½	F								
Mixed doubles						P	¼	½	F				

== Medal summary ==
=== Medal table ===
* Host nation (Japan)

Rank	Nation	Gold	Silver	Bronze	Total
1	Japan*	4	2	2	8
2	Chinese Taipei	1	2	1	4
3	North Korea	0	1	1	2
4	South Korea	0	0	3	3
5	India	0	0	1	1
5	Indonesia	0	0	1	1
5	Philippines	0	0	1	1
Totals (7 entries)		5	5	10	20

=== Medalists ===
Event	Gold	Silver	Bronze
Men's singles	Toshiki Uematsu; Japan	Takuya Kurosaka; Japan	Chen Po-yi; Chinese Taipei
Men's singles	Toshiki Uematsu; Japan	Takuya Kurosaka; Japan	Jay Meena; India
Men's team	Japan; Takuya Kurosaka; Kaito Maruyama; Takafumi Uchimoto; Toshiki Uematsu; Sora Hirooka	Chinese Taipei; Yu Kai-wen; Lin Wei-chieh; Chen Po-yi; Chen Yu-hsun; Chang Yu-sung	Indonesia; Muhammad Reza Falevi; Tio Juliandi Hutauruk; Rizky Laluyan; Bagus Angga Boedy Pradewa; Fernando Sanger
Men's team	Japan; Takuya Kurosaka; Kaito Maruyama; Takafumi Uchimoto; Toshiki Uematsu; Sora Hirooka	Chinese Taipei; Yu Kai-wen; Lin Wei-chieh; Chen Po-yi; Chen Yu-hsun; Chang Yu-sung	South Korea; Kim Jin-woong; Lee Hyung-won; Park Jae-kyu; Kim Hyun-soo; Lee Ha-neul
Women's singles	Rena Temma; Japan	Ri Jin-mi; North Korea	Ri So-hyang; North Korea
Women's singles	Rena Temma; Japan	Ri Jin-mi; North Korea	Kiho Miyamae; Japan
Women's team	Japan; Kiho Miyamae; Rio Maeda; Sakura Nakatani; Ayaka Iwakura; Rena Temma	Chinese Taipei; Zhou Yan-zhen; Chiang Min-yu; Lo Shu-ting; Hsu Chiao-ying; Huang Shih-yuan	Philippines; Princess Catindig; Noelle Mañalac; Hilary Paas; Shyryn Salazar; Christy Sañosa
Women's team	Japan; Kiho Miyamae; Rio Maeda; Sakura Nakatani; Ayaka Iwakura; Rena Temma	Chinese Taipei; Zhou Yan-zhen; Chiang Min-yu; Lo Shu-ting; Hsu Chiao-ying; Huang Shih-yuan	South Korea; Eom Ye-jin; Kim Han-sul; Kim Yeon-hwa; Hwang Jeong-mi; Lee Su-jin
Mixed doubles	Chinese Taipei; Yu Kai-wen; Huang Shih-yuan	Japan; Toshiki Uematsu; Rena Temma	Japan; Rio Maeda; Kaito Maruyama
Mixed doubles	Chinese Taipei; Yu Kai-wen; Huang Shih-yuan	Japan; Toshiki Uematsu; Rena Temma	South Korea; Kim Yeon-hwa; Park Jae-kyu

== Participating nations ==
A total of 100 athletes from 13 nations will compete in soft tennis at the 2026 Asian Games:

- Cambodia (11)
- Chinese Taipei (9)
- North Korea (2)
- India (8)
- Indonesia (10)
- Japan (10) (host)
- South Korea (9)
- Laos (7)
- Mongolia (14)
- Nepal (5)
- Pakistan (12)
- Philippines (12)
- Thailand (7)
