= Soft tennis =

Variant of tennis, played with soft rubber balls instead of hard balls

Pictogram for soft tennis

Soft tennis, in which a hollow, soft rubber ball is hit over a net with a racket, is a ball game that diverged and developed not long after the emergence of lawn tennis – the modern game of tennis. It uses courts of the same size as lawn tennis and rackets similar in shape to those used in lawn tennis. It can be played in either singles or doubles, but the latter is far more common. The sport started in Japan and has spread to the rest of Asia as well as Eastern Europe. The ball is made of the same rubber as lawn tennis balls, but it is not covered with felt. This makes the balls lighter and consequently more susceptible to wind. They also spin far more easily than lawn tennis balls.

The development of this sport is unique among racquet sports in that it has developed almost exclusively as a doubles sport. In the course of its development, positional specialization increased, but in recent years all-around play has been introduced, mainly from overseas, leading to diversification of the sport. In the mid-1990s, singles was officially adopted and has continued to the present day. In 2003, a major rule revision made the game far more similar to lawn tennis.

== History ==
Soft tennis originated in Japan in 1884. At the end of the 19th century, tennis was introduced to Japan by a Western missionary, and it was later modified to better suit Japanese tastes. A special racquet and ball were developed, and the game became known as soft tennis (ソフトテニス, sofutotenisu). Soft tennis was included in the 1990 Asian Games as an exhibition game and later became an official event at the 1994 Asian Games. It continues to be an official event at the Asian Games.

- In 1955, the Asian Soft Tennis Federation was established by Japan, South Korea and Taiwan. The federation was responsible for the Asian Championships that involved the three countries from 1956 to 1973.
- In 1970, the Japan-US Soft Tennis Promotion Liaison Council is established. This organization works with American schools and organized a match between Japanese and American junior high school students.
- In 1972, the Hawaii Soft Tennis Federation was established in Hawaii. It became a popular sport in PE in Hawaii and there was also a state championship for soft tennis.
- Associations were established in Hong Kong, Venezuela, and Brazil.
- In June 1974, the first Japan-US High School Friendship Tournament took place.
- In 1973, the International Soft Tennis Federation was established.
- In 1975, the first World Soft Tennis Championships (now known as the World Soft Tennis Championships) were held in Hawaii, sponsored by the International Soft Tennis Federation and under the supervision of the Japanese Soft Tennis Federation.
- In 1977, the second world championship was held in Taichung City, Taiwan.
- In the latter half of the 1970s, the sport was popularized in Africa, especially in Zaire (now Democratic Republic of the Congo) and Europe
- In October 1978, the Scout Association of Japan promoted the sport on the West Coast of the United States. This was first instance of the sport being demonstrated in the continental United States. Exhibitions and demonstrations were held mainly at high schools and universities.
- In 1979, the third World Championship was held in Daegu, South Korea.
- In 1979, a national team traveled to California to demonstrate the sport
- The promotion of the sport continued in Eastern Europe, with the European Soft Tennis Federation being founded and tournaments being held in Hungary, Czech Republic, and Poland.
- In 1981, the fourth world championship was held in Hilo, Hawaii. The Japan Federation run tournament was expected to be held in Japan, but it was abandoned due to the Taiwan issue. The tournament was instead moved to Hawaii.
- In December 1982, the first Asian Student Championship was held in Tainan City, Taiwan.
- In 1983, the fifth world championship was held in Taichung City, Taiwan. South Korea won a title over Japan for the first time.
- In November 1984, the second Asian Student Championship was held in Daegu, South Korea.
- In 1985, the sixth world championship was held for the first time in Japan specifically in Aichi Prefectural Gymnasium in Nagoya City. In the men's tournament, Taiwan won the doubles championship and was in the top four in singles.
- The sport was promoted in Asian countries other than Taiwan, Japan, and South Korea.
- In November 1986, the third Asian Student Championship was held in the Komazawa Gymnasium in Tokyo.
- In 1986, an international soft tennis convention is held in São Paulo, Brazil. The United States, Canada, the Dominican Republic, Paraguay, Japan, and Brazil all participated in the event.
- In 1987, the 7th World Championship was held in Seoul, South Korea.
- February 1988 Established by the Asian Soft Tennis Federation (ASTF) [Note 20]
- 1988 ASTF joins OCA (Olympic Council of Asia).
- In 1988, the 1st Asian Soft Tennis Championships was held in Nagoya City [Note 21].
- In 1989, the 8th World Championship was scheduled to be held in Taiwan, but it was canceled.
- In 1990, the 11th Asian Games was held in Beijing. Soft tennis participates as a public event [Note 22].
- In 1991, the 9th World Championship was held in Seoul, South Korea. It will be held every four years after this tournament.
- In 1992, the 2nd Asian Soft Tennis Championships was held in Jakarta, Indonesia. Singles were introduced for the first time in this tournament (individual competition only).
- In 1993, the 1st Southeast Asian Championship was held in Bangkok, Thailand.
- In 1993, the 1st East Asian Games was held in Shanghai. Initially, soft tennis was not an event, but I hurriedly participated as an open event. Only team competitions were played. The competition method will be 3 doubles and 2 singles, which will be followed until the 2002 Asian Games.
- In 1994, the 12th Asian Games (ASIAN GAMES) was held in Hiroshima City, and soft tennis participated for the first time as a formal competition [Note 23].
- 1995 10th World Championships held in Gifu (5th event [Note 24])
- 1996 3rd Asian Championship held in Bangkok, Thailand
- 1997 Participated in the 2nd East Asian Games (Busan) as a formal competition (group, doubles, singles).
- 1998 Participated in the 13th Asian Games (Bangkok) as a formal competition (group, doubles).
- 1999 11th World Championships held in Linkou, Taiwan (6 events other than mix)
- 2000 4th Asian Championships held in Saga (6th event other than mix)
- Participated in the 3rd East Asian Games (Osaka) in 2001 as a formal competition (6 events other than the mix)
- 2002 Participated as a formal competition in the 14th Asian Games (Busan). Mixed doubles, men's singles, and women's singles have been added for a total of 7 events. After that, this will be inherited at various international competitions.
- 2003 The 12th World Championships are held in Hiroshima. Team battles are now 2 doubles and 1 singles. This will be followed thereafter. [Note 25] (7th event. Singles has become the current rule from this tournament)
- 2004 5th Asian Soft Tennis Championships held in Chiang Mai, Thailand (hard court, 7th event)
- Participated in the 4th East Asian Games (Macau) in 2005 as a formal competition (hardcourt, sixth event excluding mix)
- 2006 Participated in the 15th Asian Games (Doha) as a formal competition (hardcourt, seventh event).
- September 2007 The 13th World Championships are held in Anseong, South Korea. Participation from 42 countries and regions. It was the biggest tournament in history.
- 2008 6th Asian Soft Tennis Championships held in Mungyeong, South Korea (7th event)
- In 2009, the INTERNATIONAL JUNIOR SOFT TENNIS TOURNAMENT [Note 27], which is an international tournament for youth by age [Note 26], started. The first convention was held in Yokkaichi City in December [Note 28]
- The 5th East Asian Games was held in Hong Kong in 2009, but soft tennis is excluded from the competition
- Participated in the 16th Asian Games (Guangzhou) as a formal competition in 2010 (7th event).
- 2011 The 14th World Championships are held in Mungyeong, South Korea.
- Participated in the 2011 Southeast Asian Games [Note 29] as a formal competition (26th Southeast Asian Games SEA GAMES).
- 2012 7th Asian Soft Tennis Championships held in Chiayi, Taiwan (7th event)
- Participated in the 2013 5th East Asian Games (Tianjin) as a formal competition (7th event)
- Participated in the 17th Asian Games (Incheon) in 2014 as a formal competition (7th event).
- In November 2014, the 2nd World Junior Championships [Note 30] was held in India.
- 2015 15th World Championships held in New Delhi, India (7th event).
- 2016 8th Asian Soft Tennis Championships Held in Soga (Chiba City) [Note 31]
- Participated in the 2018 18th Asian Games (Jakarta / Palembang, Indonesia) as a formal competition [Note 32].
- In November 2018, the 3rd World Junior Championships [Note 33] was held in Suncheon, South Korea.
- The 1st East Asian Youth Games [Note 34] was scheduled to be held in Taichung, Taiwan in 2019, but it was canceled [Note 35].
- In August 2019, the 1st Asian Junior Championships [Note 36] will be held in Quezon, Philippines.
- In September 2019, the 1st Asian University Championship [Note 37] will be held in Quezon, Philippines.
- In October 2019, the 16th World Championship will be held for the first time in mainland China (Taizhou City, Zhejiang Province).
- Participated in the 2019 Southeast Asian Games as a formal competition (30th Southeast Asian Games SEA GAMES). Participation for the second time following the 26th tournament.
- The 9th Asian Soft Tennis Championships in 2020 was scheduled to be held in Chiang Mai, Thailand, but it was postponed for one year due to the influence of the coronavirus [5].

=== Current situation in Japan ===
In the 1970s, it was said that "soft tennis is the most popular sport in middle and high school". Currently, there are about 600,000 registered competitors in Japan. The Japan Soft Tennis Federation estimates that there are about 7 million enthusiasts. However, the sport is widely perceived by its enthusiasts as a minor sport. Suggested causes include that it is not an Olympic event, that there have long been no professional athletes in Japan, that it is regarded mainly as a school physical education activity in junior high and high schools, and the influence of lawn tennis, which has rapidly become popular in Japan since the 1980s.

== International Soft Tennis Federation ==
The International Soft Tennis Federation (ISTF) was established in 1973 and is the international governing body for soft tennis.

In 1970 the Japan-US Soft Tennis Promotion Liaison Council was established. It served as a liaison organization with American schools and organised a friendly match between Japan and the United States for junior high school students.

In 1972, the Hawaii Soft Tennis Federation was established in Hawaii, United States. A state championship was held at the same time. Soft tennis was adopted as a regular physical education event at a public high school in Hawaii.

Around the time of the establishment of the Hawaii Soft Tennis Association, the Hong Kong Soft Tennis Association was established with the assistance of Taiwan (Republic of China Network Association). Soft tennis associations were also established in Venezuela and Brazil.

In June 1974 the first Japan-US High School Friendship Tournament was held.

=== Members ===
As of 2022 the ISTF had 60 members:

- Asia:25
- Oceania:2
- Europe:21
- America:11
- Africa:1

=== Countries ===
ISTF Members
Argentina
Australia
Austria
(Basque Country (autonomous community)) Basque Country
Belgium
Brazil
Cambodia
Canada
China
Costa Rica
Curaçao
(Czech Republic) Czechia
Denmark
Dominican Republic
France
Germany
Hong Kong
Hungary
India
Indonesia
Italy
Japan
Kazakhstan
South Korea
Laos
Macau
Malaysia
Maldives
Malta
(Monaco) Mongolia
Nepal
The Netherlands
New Zealand
North Korea
Norway
Pakistan
Panama
Peru
The Philippines
Poland
Puerto Rico
Romania
Russia
Scotland
Singapore
Slovakia
Spain
Sweden
Switzerland
Chinese Taipei
Tajikistan
Thailand
(Timor-Leste) East Timor
Turkmenistan
The United Kingdom
The United States
Uzbekistan
Venezuela
Vietnam
Zambia

== Competition ==
Most of the rules for soft tennis are the same as those for regular tennis. When the rules were revised in 1992, singles became a formal event. This revision also enabled a forward player in doubles to serve. The serve plays an important role in a team's chances of winning. The world championship was held every two years until 1987. Since then, the competition has been held every four years. The following is a list of World Soft Tennis Championships and World Junior Soft Tennis Championships held by the International Soft Tennis Federation.

=== World Soft Tennis Championships ===
| Year | Number | Host City | Host Country |
|---|---|---|---|
| 1975 | 1 | Hawaii | United States |
| 1977 | 2 | Taichung | Taiwan |
| 1979 | 3 | Daegu | South Korea |
| 1981 | 4 | Hawaii | United States |
| 1983 | 5 | Taichung | Taiwan |
| 1985 | 6 | Nagoya | Japan |
| 1987 | 7 | Seoul | South Korea |
| 1991 | 9 | Seoul | South Korea |
| 1995 | 10 | Gifu | Japan |
| 1999 | 11 | Taipei | Taiwan |
| 2003 | 12 | Hiroshima | Japan |
| 2007 | 13 | Anseong | South Korea |
| 2011 | 14 | Mungyeong | South Korea |
| 2015 | 15 | New Delhi | India |
| 2019 | 16 | Taizhou | China |
| 2024 | 17 | Anseong | South Korea |

=== World Junior Soft Tennis Championships ===
| Year | Number | Host City | Host Country |
|---|---|---|---|
| 2009 | 1 | Yokkaichi | Japan |
| 2014 | 2 | Ahmedabad | India |
| 2019 | 3 | Suncheon | South Korea |

== Court dimensions ==
The dimensions of a soft tennis court

| Line Name | Line Length |
|---|---|
| Base Line for Singles | 8.23 m |
| Base Line for Doubles | 10.97 m |
| Side Line for Singles | 23.77 m |
| Side Line for Doubles | 23.77 m |
| Service Line | 8.23 m |
| Side Service Line | 12.80 m |
| Center Service Line | 12.80 m |
| Center Mark | 0.15 m |
| Net | 12.65 m |
