= India at the 2026 Asian Games =

- Flag of India
- IOC code: IND
- NOC: Indian Olympic Association
- Website: olympic.ind.in

in Aichi and Nagoya, Japan 19 September 2026 – 4 October 2026
- Competitors: 495 in 36 sports
- Flag bearers (opening): Manu Bhaker; Pawan Sehrawat
- Flag bearer (closing): Neeru Dhanda
- Medals Ranked 4th: Gold 21 Silver 27 Bronze 37 Total 85

Asian Games appearances (overview)
- 1951; 1954; 1958; 1962; 1966; 1970; 1974; 1978; 1982; 1986; 1990; 1994; 1998; 2002; 2006; 2010; 2014; 2018; 2022; 2026

India competed at the 2026 Asian Games in Nagoya, Aichi Prefecture, Japan from 19 September to 4 October 2026. This was the country's 20th consecutive appearance in the competition, having made its debut at the inaugural 1951 Asian Games. The Indian contingent consisted of 495 athletes competing in 36 sports. Sports shooter Manu Bhaker and kabaddi player Pawan Sehrawat were the nation's flag-bearers during the opening ceremony. Shooter Neeru Dhanda was the flag-bearer for the closing ceremony. India finished fourth in the medal table with 85 medals including 21 gold, 27 silver, and 37 bronze medals. It was India's second highest medal tally at the Asian Games after the 2022 edition.

== Background ==
The Indian Olympic Association (IOA) was established in 1927 and recognised by the International Olympic Committee in the same year. India was one of the founding members of the Asian Games Federation (AGF), established on 13 February 1949. On 26 November 1981, the Olympic Council of Asia (OCA) replaced the AGF, and India became a member of the OCA.

India hosted the first Asian Games in 1951 at New Delhi. The 2026 Asian Games were held in Nagoya and other parts of Aichi Prefecture in Japan from 19 September to 4 October. The 2026 edition marked India's 20th consecutive appearance at the Asian Games. India's best performance came in the 2023 Asian Games at Hangzhou where the country finished fourth in the medal table with 106 medals including 28 gold, 38 silver, 40 bronze medals.

On 22 August 2026, the Ministry of Youth Affairs and Sports announced a 492-member Indian contingent for the Games. On 2 September 2026, the ministry released a revised list of 503 athletes and 265 support staff for the Games. The final traveling contingent consisted of 495 athletes. Sahdev Yadav, the treasurer of the IOA, was the Chef de Mission with Sharath Kamal chosen as his deputy. On 18 September 2026, Manu Bhaker and Tajinderpal Singh Toor were announced as the nation's flag-bearers during the opening ceremony. However, Toor withdrew from the opening ceremony after the arrival of his kit was delayed and was replaced by Pawan Sehrawat as the flag bearer. Shooter Neeru Dhanda was the flag-bearer for the closing ceremony.

=== Broadcasting ===
Sony Pictures Networks acquired the broadcast rights for the country, with Sony Sports Network as the television broadcaster and SonyLIV as the digital broadcaster.

== Medal summary ==
India finished fourth in the medal table with 85 medals including 21 gold, 27 silver, and 37 bronze medals. It was their 2nd best finish ever after the 2022 edition.

=== Medalists ===
Medal	Athlete	Sport	Event	Date
Gold	India women's national cricket team: Harmanpreet Kaur; Smriti Mandhana; Shafali Verma; Arundhati Reddy; Deepti Sharma; Richa Ghosh; Gunalan Kamalini; Bharti Fulmali; Kranti Gaud; Nandani Sharma; Pratika Rawal; Radha Yadav; Renuka Singh Thakur; Shree Charani; Shreyanka Patil	Cricket	Women's tournament	22 September
Gold	Kamaljeet Sahlot; Suruchi Singh	Shooting	Mixed 10 m air pistol team	25 September
Gold	India women's national kabaddi team: Pushpa Rana; Bhavna Thakur; Jyoti Thakur; Manisha Kumari; Nikita Kumari; Pinki Roy; Pooja Hathwala; Raj Rani; Ritu Negi; Ritu Sheoran; Sanju Devi; Sonali Shingate	Kabaddi	Women's tournament	26 September
Gold	India men's national kabaddi team: Sunil Kumar; Ankit Jaglan; Arjun Deshwal; Ashu Malik; Aslam Inamdar; Ayan Lohchab; Devank Dalal; Gaurav Khatri; Jaideep Dahiya; Pawan Sehrawat; Rahul Sethpal; Sumit Sangwan	Kabaddi	Men's tournament	26 September
Gold	Neeru Dhanda	Shooting	Women's trap	29 September
Gold	Kiran Pahal; Poovamma Machettira; Prachi Choudhary; Vithya Ramraj	Athletics	Women's 4 × 400 m relay	29 September
Gold	Chikitha Taniparthi; Jyothi Surekha Vennam; Prithika Pradeep	Archery	Women's team compound	30 September
Gold	Chikitha Taniparthi; Sahil Jadhav	Archery	Mixed team compound	30 September
Gold	Kynan Chenai; Neeru Dhanda	Shooting	Mixed trap team	30 September
Gold	Kushal Dalal; Sahil Jadhav; T. G. Mani Ratnam	Archery	Men's team compound	30 September
Gold	Ankita Bhakat; Kirti Sharma; Kumkum Mohod	Archery	Women's team recurve	2 October
Gold	Lovlina Borgohain	Boxing	Women's 75 kg	2 October
Gold	Parveen Hooda	Boxing	Women's 65 kg	2 October
Gold	Sujeet Kalkal	Wrestling	Men's freestyle 65 kg	2 October
Gold	Ankush Panghal	Boxing	Men's 80 kg	2 October
Gold	India women's national field hockey team: Salima Tete; Lalremsiami Hmarzote; Navneet Kaur; Deepika Sehrawat; Ishika Chaudhary; Baljeet Kaur; Beauty Dungdung; Nikki Pradhan; Sakshi Rana; Sunelita Toppo; Neha Goyal; Ishika; Sushila Chanu Pukhrambam; Lalthantluangi; Jyoti Rumavat; Shilpi Dabas; Savita Punia; Bichu Devi Kharibam	Field hockey	Women's tournament	2 October
Gold	Kumkum Mohod	Archery	Women's individual recurve	3 October
Gold	Pranavi Urs	Golf	Women's individual	3 October
Gold	India men's national cricket team: Shreyas Iyer; Tilak Varma; Ravi Bishnoi; Jasprit Bumrah; Shivam Dube; Ishan Kishan; Vipraj Nigam; Axar Patel; Sanju Samson; Abhishek Sharma; Arshdeep Singh; Washington Sundar; Vaibhav Sooryavanshi; Yash Thakur	Cricket	Men's tournament	3 October
Gold	Aman Sehrawat	Wrestling	Men's freestyle 57 kg	3 October
Gold	India men's national field hockey team: Harmanpreet Singh; Dilpreet Singh; Shilanand Lakra; Sukhjeet Singh; Mandeep Singh; Abhishek Nain; Rajinder Singh; Raj Kumar Pal; Hardik Singh; Manpreet Singh; Nilakanta Sharma; Vivek Prasad; Jarmanpreet Singh; Amit Rohidas; Jugraj Singh; Sanjay Rana; Sumit Kumar; Yashdeep Siwach; Mohith H. S.; Suraj Karkera	Field Hockey	Men's tournament	3 October
Silver	Elavenil Valarivan; Sonam Maskar; Vidarsa Vinod	Shooting	Women's 10 m air rifle team	20 September
Silver	Elavenil Valarivan	Shooting	Women's 10 m air rifle	20 September
Silver	Himanshu Dhillon; Parth Mane; Rudrankksh Patil	Shooting	Men's 10 m air rifle team	21 September
Silver	Himanshu Dhillon	Shooting	Men's 10 m air rifle	21 September
Silver	Mirabai Chanu	Weightlifting	Women's 49 kg	23 September
Silver	Naorem Roshibina Devi	Wushu	Women's sanda 60 kg	24 September
Silver	Manu T. S.; Poovamma Machettira; Vishal T. K.; Vithya Ramraj; Jay Kumar; Kiran Pahal	Athletics	Mixed 4 × 400 m relay	24 September
Silver	Aishwary Singh Tomar; Niraj Kumar; Rudrankksh Patil	Shooting	Men's 50 m rifle three positions team	25 September
Silver	Gulveer Singh	Athletics	Men's 10,000 m	25 September
Silver	Sawan Barwal	Athletics	Men's marathon	26 September
Silver	Ashi Chouksey; Tilottama Sen; Vidarsa Vinod	Shooting	Women's 50 m rifle three positions	26 September
Silver	Tajinderpal Singh Toor	Athletics	Men's shot put	26 September
Silver	Abhay Singh	Squash	Men's singles	27 September
Silver	Anahat Singh	Squash	Women's singles	27 September
Silver	Ancy Sojan	Athletics	Women's long jump	27 September
Silver	Sarvesh Kushare	Athletics	Men's high jump	27 September
Silver	Esha Singh	Shooting	Women's 25 m pistol	28 September
Silver	Gulveer Singh	Athletics	Men's 1500 m	28 September
Silver	Murali Sreeshankar	Athletics	Men's Long jump	28 September
Silver	Yashvir Singh	Athletics	Men's Javelin throw	28 September
Silver	Aashima Ahlawat; Manisha Keer; Neeru Dhanda	Shooting	Women's trap team	29 September
Silver	Manu Francis; Prince Noble	Sailing	Men's 49er	1 October
Silver	Nitesh Siwach	Wrestling	Men's Greco-Roman 97 kg	1 October
Silver	Kumkum Mohod; Dhiraj Bommadevara	Archery	Mixed team recurve	2 October
Silver	Dhiraj Bommadevara; Neeraj Chauhan; Yashdeep Bhoge	Archery	Men's team recurve	2 October
Silver	Pranavi Urs; Aditi Ashok; Diksha Dagar	Golf	Women's team	3 October
Silver	Antim Panghal	Wrestling	Women's Freestyle 53 kg	3 October
Bronze	Suchika Tariyal	Mixed martial arts	Women's 60 kg	21 September
Bronze	Rudrankksh Patil	Shooting	Men's 10 m air rifle	21 September
Bronze	Maheshwari Chauhan; Parinaaz Dhaliwal; Raiza Dhillon	Shooting	Women's skeet team	23 September
Bronze	Anantjeet Singh Naruka; Bhavtegh Singh Gill; Mairaj Ahmed Khan	Shooting	Men's skeet team	23 September
Bronze	Jay Meena	Soft Tennis	Men's Singles	23 September
Bronze	Arjun M. R.; Ayush Shetty; Chirag Shetty; Dhruv Kapila; Hariharan Amsakarunan; Lakshya Sen; Prannoy H. S.; Satwiksairaj Rankireddy; Srikanth Kidambi; Tharun Mannepalli	Badminton	Men's team	23 September
Bronze	Satnam Singh; Salman Khan	Rowing	Men's double sculls	24 September
Bronze	Anantjeet Singh Naruka; Parinaaz Dhaliwal	Shooting	Mixed skeet team	24 September
Bronze	Seema Kumari	Athletics	Women's 10,000 m	24 September
Bronze	Diya Chitale; Manush Shah	Table tennis	Mixed doubles	25 September
Bronze	Manpreet Kaur	Athletics	Women's shot put	25 September
Bronze	Baranica Elangovan	Athletics	Women's pole vault	25 September
Bronze	Velavan Senthilkumar; Joshna Chinappa	Squash	Mixed doubles	26 September
Bronze	Prachi Choudhary	Athletics	Women's 400 m	26 September
Bronze	Harita Bhadra	Athletics	Women's 200 m	27 September
Bronze	Tejaswin Shankar	Athletics	Men's decathlon	27 September
Bronze	Parul Chaudhary	Athletics	Women's 3000 m steeplechase	27 September
Bronze	Pincky Balhara	Kurash	Women's 78 kg	28 September
Bronze	Vithya Ramraj	Athletics	Women's 400 m hurdles	28 September
Bronze	Parul Chaudhary	Athletics	Women's 5000 m	28 September
Bronze	Rohit Yadav	Athletics	Men's Javelin throw	28 September
Bronze	Narender Berwal	Boxing	Men's +90 kg	29 September
Bronze	Gulveer Singh	Athletics	Men's 5000 m	29 September
Bronze	Gurindervir Singh; Abinaya Rajarajan; Sneha Gowda; Animesh Kujur; Harita Bhadra	Athletics	Mixed 4 × 100 m relay	29 September
Bronze	Pooja Singh	Athletics	Women's high jump	29 September
Bronze	Vishal T. K.; Dharmveer Choudhary; Rajesh Ramesh; Manu T. S.; Jay Kumar	Athletics	Men's 4 × 400 m relay	29 September
Bronze	Priya Ghanghas	Boxing	Women's 60 kg	30 September
Bronze	Kapil Pokhariya	Boxing	Men's 90 kg	30 September
Bronze	Sunil Kumar	Wrestling	Men's Greco-Roman 87 kg	30 September
Bronze	Anahat Singh; Tanvi Khanna; Joshna Chinappa; Shameena Riaz	Squash	Women's team	1 October
Bronze	T. G. Mani Ratnam	Archery	Men's individual compound	1 October
Bronze	Abhay Singh; Veer Chotrani; Velavan Senthilkumar; Suraj Chand	Squash	Men's team	1 October
Bronze	Harshita Tomar; Shital Verma	Sailing	Women's 49erFX	1 October
Bronze	Nethra Kumanan	Sailing	Women's ILCA 6	2 October
Bronze	Arun Raju; Bobby Kumar; Amarjit Singha; Malemnganba Singh Sorokhaibam; Lokhon Singh Elangbam; Akash Yumnam	Sepak takraw	Men's quadrant	2 October
Bronze	Neeraj Chauhan	Archery	Men's individual recurve	3 October
Bronze	Deepak Punia	Wrestling	Men's Freestyle 97 kg	3 October

=== Medals by sport ===
Medals by events
Sport	Gold	Silver	Bronze	Total
Archery	5	2	2	9
Shooting	3	8	4	15
Boxing	3	0	3	6
Wrestling	2	2	2	6
Cricket	2	0	0	2
Field hockey	2	0	0	2
Kabaddi	2	0	0	2
Athletics	1	9	14	24
Golf	1	1	0	2
Squash	0	2	3	5
Sailing	0	1	2	3
Weightlifting	0	1	0	1
Wushu	0	1	0	1
Badminton	0	0	1	1
Kurash	0	0	1	1
Mixed martial arts	0	0	1	1
Rowing	0	0	1	1
Sepak takraw	0	0	1	1
Soft tennis	0	0	1	1
Table tennis	0	0	1	1
Total	21	27	37	85

=== Medals by day ===
Medals by day
Day	Date	Gold	Silver	Bronze	Total
1	20 September	0	2	0	2
2	21 September	0	2	2	4
3	22 September	1	0	0	1
4	23 September	0	1	4	5
5	24 September	0	2	3	5
6	25 September	1	2	3	6
7	26 September	2	3	2	7
8	27 September	0	4	3	7
9	28 September	0	4	4	8
10	29 September	2	1	5	8
11	30 September	4	0	3	7
12	1 October	0	2	4	6
13	2 October	6	2	2	10
14	3 October	5	2	2	9
15	4 October	0	0	0	0
Total		21	27	37	85

=== Medals by gender ===
Medals by gender
Gender	Gold	Silver	Bronze	Total
Female	11	11	16	38
Male	7	14	17	38
Mixed	3	2	4	9
Total	21	27	37	85

Multiple medalists
Athlete	Event	1st place, gold medalist(s)	2nd place, silver medalist(s)	3rd place, bronze medalist(s)	Total
Kumkum Mohod	Archery	2	1	0	3
Neeru Dhanda	Shooting	2	1	0	3
Chikitha Taniparthi	Archery	2	0	0	2
Sahil Jadhav	Archery	2	0	0	2
Vithya Ramraj	Athletics	1	1	1	3
Kiran Pahal	Athletics	1	1	0	2
Poovamma Machettira	Athletics	1	1	0	2
Pranavi Urs	Golf	1	1	0	2
Prachi Choudhary	Athletics	1	0	1	2
T. G. Mani Ratnam	Archery	1	0	1	2
Gulveer Singh	Athletics	0	2	1	3
Rudrankksh Patil	Shooting	0	2	1	3
Dhiraj Bommadevara	Archery	0	2	0	2
Elavenil Valarivan	Shooting	0	2	0	2
Himanshu Dhillon	Shooting	0	2	0	2
Vidarsa Vinod	Shooting	0	2	0	2
Abhay Singh	Squash	0	1	1	2
Anahat Singh	Squash	0	1	1	2
Jay Kumar	Athletics	0	1	1	2
Manu T. S.	Athletics	0	1	1	2
Neeraj Chauhan	Archery	0	1	1	2
Vishal T. K.	Athletics	0	1	1	2
Anantjeet Singh Naruka	Shooting	0	0	2	2
Harita Bhadra	Athletics	0	0	2	2
Joshna Chinappa	Squash	0	0	2	2
Parinaaz Dhaliwal	Shooting	0	0	2	2
Parul Chaudhary	Athletics	0	0	2	2
Velavan Senthilkumar	Squash	0	0	2	2

== Competitors ==
The Indian contingent consisted of 495 athletes competing in 36 sports.

Sport	Men	Women	Total
Archery	6	6	12
Athletics	35	40	75
Badminton	10	10	20
Boxing	6	5	11
Canoeing	10	9	19
Cricket	14	15	29
Cycling	6	8	14
Equestrian	6	1	7
Esports	15	0	15
Fencing	8	12	20
Field hockey	20	20	40
Golf	3	3	6
Gymnastics	0	1	1
Judo	0	3	3
Kabaddi	12	12	24
Karate	1	1	2
Kurash	3	3	6
Mixed martial arts	1	1	2
Rowing	17	5	22
Rugby sevens	0	13	13
Sailing	4	6	10
Sepak takraw	12	9	21
Shooting	15	15	30
Soft tennis	5	1	6
Sport climbing	1	1	2
Squash	4	4	8
Surfing	2	2	4
Swimming	12	0	12
Table tennis	5	5	10
Taekwondo	0	3	3
Tennis	5	2	7
Teqball	2	1	3
Volleyball	12	0	12
Weightlifting	0	4	4
Wrestling	9	6	15
Wushu	3	4	7
Total	264	231	495

== Archery ==
The Archery Association of India held the selection trials for the Asian Games at the Sports Authority of India (SAI) facility in Sonipat in May 2026. A total of 12 athletes were selected across the recurve and compound events.

Compound
Individual

Archer	Event	Ranking Round (Note: In the individual events, only the top two ranked archers from each nation advance to the knock out rounds.)		Round of 64	Round of 32	Round of 16	Quarterfinals	Semi-finals	Final / BM	Rank
Archer	Event	Score	Seed	Opposition Score	Opposition Score	Opposition Score	Opposition Score	Opposition Score	Opposition Score	Rank
Sahil Jadhav	Men's	709	5 Q	—N/a	Purevdorj (MGL); W 149–137	Mani Ratnam (IND); L 148–149	Did not advance			9
T. G. Mani Ratnam	Men's	704	14 Q	—N/a	Rinaldi (INA); W 144–142	Jadhav (IND); W 149–148	Chen (TPE); W 148–138	Kim J-h (KOR); L 144–148	Dang (VIE); W 149–144	3rd place, bronze medalist(s)
Kushal Dalal	Men's	704	16	Did not advance						34
Chikitha Taniparthi	Women's	705	1 Q	Bye	Dolma (BHU); W 149–140	Chen (TPE); W 148^{10+}–148^{10}	Nurisa (INA); L 143–144	Did not advance		5
Jyothi Surekha	Women's	699	13 Q	Bye	Zhexenbinova (KAZ); W 148–145	Kang (KOR); L 146–150	Did not advance			9
Prithika Pradeep	Women's	695	20	Did not advance						42

Team

Archer	Event	Ranking Round		Round of 16	Quarterfinals	Semi-finals	Final	Rank
Archer	Event	Score	Seed	Opposition Score	Opposition Score	Opposition Score	Opposition Score	Rank
Kushal Dalal; Sahil Jadhav; T. G. Mani Ratnam	Men's	2117	3 Q	United Arab Emirates (UAE); W 235–215	Bhutan (BHU); W 235–232	South Korea (KOR); W 236–229	China (CHN); W 238–237	1st place, gold medalist(s)
Chikitha Taniparthi; Jyothi Surekha; Prithika Pradeep	Women's	2099	2 Q	Mongolia (MGL); W 238–223	Kazakhstan (KAZ); W 233–230	South Korea (KOR); W 234–233	China (CHN); W 238–234	1st place, gold medalist(s)
Chikitha Taniparthi; Sahil Jadhav	Mixed	1414; GR	1 Q	Mongolia (MGL); W 160–146	Kazakhstan (KAZ); W 159–154	Thailand (THA); W 156–155	South Korea (KOR); W 157^{20}–157^{19}	1st place, gold medalist(s)

Recurve
Individual

Archer	Event	Ranking Round		Round of 64	Round of 32	Round of 16	Quarterfinals	Semi-finals	Final / BM	Rank
Archer	Event	Score	Seed	Opposition Score	Opposition Score	Opposition Score	Opposition Score	Opposition Score	Opposition Score	Rank
Dhiraj Bommadevara	Men's	698; GR	1 Q	Bye	Garcia (PHI); W 6–0	Cheng (TPE); W 6–2	Sadikov (UZB); W 6–2	Lee (KOR); L 3–7	Chauhan (IND); L 4–6	4
Neeraj Chauhan	Men's	676	20 Q	Bye	Salsabilla (INA); W 6–4	Kim (KOR); W 6–4	Lam (BHU); W 7–1	Nakanishi (JPN); L 1–7	Bommadevara (IND); W 6–4	3rd place, bronze medalist(s)
Yashdeep Bhoge	Men's	665	25	Did not advance						45
Kumkum Mohod	Women's	666	10 Q	Bye	Bishindeegiin (MGL); W 6–0	Saima (BAN); W 6–0	Kang (KOR); W 6–4	Zhu (CHN); W 6–2	Yejin (KOR); W 6–5	1st place, gold medalist(s)
Kirti Sharma	Women's	653	20 Q	Bye	Hoang (VIE); W 7–3	Kang (KOR); L 3–7	Did not advance			11
Ankita Bhakat	Women's	643	25	Did not advance						44

Team

Archer	Event	Ranking Round		Round of 32	Round of 16	Quarterfinals	Semi-finals	Final	Rank
Archer	Event	Score	Seed	Opposition Score	Opposition Score	Opposition Score	Opposition Score	Opposition Score	Rank
Dhiraj Bommadevara; Neeraj Chauhan; Yashdeep Bhoge	Men's	2039	2 Q	Bye	Philippines (PHI); W 5–1	China (CHN); W 5–1	Iran (IRI); W 6–0	South Korea (KOR); L 1–5	2nd place, silver medalist(s)
Ankita Bhakat; Kirti Sharma; Kumkum Mohod	Women's	1962	6 Q	—N/a	Mongolia (MGL); W 6–0	Chinese Taipei (TPE); W 6–0	China (CHN); W 5–1	South Korea (KOR); W 5–3	1st place, gold medalist(s)
Kumkum Mohod; Dhiraj Bommadevara	Mixed	1364	2 Q	Bye	United Arab Emirates (UAE); W 6–0	Vietnam (VIE); W 6–0	Japan (JPN); W 5–3	China (CHN); L 3–5	2nd place, silver medalist(s)

Key

- Q = Qualified for the next round
- W = Win
- L = Loss

== Athletics ==
India initially announced a 79-member squad to compete in the athletic events. Runner Abhishek Pal failed a dope test, hurdler Tejas Shirse pulled out due to an injury, and Annu Rani, Nithya Gandhe, and Shahnavaz Khan were dropped from the squad. Javelin thrower Yashvir Singh replaced the injured Neeraj Chopra, while long jumper David Solomon replaced Khan. The final squad consisted of 75 athletes competing in 41 events. On 26 September 2026, Jyothi Yarraji did not compete in the women's 100 m hurdles heats, and Praveen Chithravel pulled out after his first jump in the men's triple jump due to an injury.

Track events
Men

Athlete	Event	Heats		Semi-final		Final	
Athlete	Event	Result	Rank	Result	Rank	Result	Rank
Animesh Kujur	100 m	10.36	3 Q	10.38	7	Did not advance	
Gurindervir Singh	100 m	10.38	2 Q	10.32	5	Did not advance	
Animesh Kujur	200 m	21.10	1 Q	20.81	2 Q	20.80	5
Vishal T. K.	400 m	45.27	1 Q	—N/a		45.48	5
Krishan Kumar	800 m	1:50.38	3	—N/a		Did not advance	
Mohammed Afsal	800 m	1:47.37	3 q	—N/a		1:48.27	8
Gulveer Singh	1500 m	3:45.79	3 Q	—N/a		3:36.72; PB	2nd place, silver medalist(s)
Yoonus Shah	1500 m	3:45.77	3 Q	—N/a		3:43.88	9
Avinash Sable	5000 m	—N/a				DNS	
Gulveer Singh	5000 m	—N/a				13:32.75	3rd place, bronze medalist(s)
Gulveer Singh	10,000 m	—N/a				28:29.38	2nd place, silver medalist(s)
Santhosh Tamilarasan	400 m hurdles	49.61	2 Q	—N/a		49.95	7
Yashas Palaksha	400 m hurdles	DNF		—N/a		Did not advance	
Avinash Sable	3000 m steeplechase	—N/a				8:21.67; SB	4

Women

Athlete	Event	Heats		Final	
Athlete	Event	Result	Rank	Result	Rank
Harita Bhadra	200 m	23.31	2 Q	23.20	3rd place, bronze medalist(s)
Unnathi Aiyappa	200 m	23.33; PB	3 Q	23.46	6
Kiran Pahal	400 m	53.54	2 Q	53.41	5
Prachi Choudhary	400 m	53.46	3 Q	53.21	3rd place, bronze medalist(s)
Gowthami Jayaraman	800 m	2:04.31	4	Did not advance	
Pooja Olla	800 m	2:03.20	5 q	2:06.72	7
Parul Chaudhary	1500 m	—N/a		4:09.46 PB	4
Pooja Olla	1500 m	—N/a		4:16.78	6
Parul Chaudhary	5000 m	—N/a		15:14.61	3rd place, bronze medalist(s)
Seema Kumari	5000 m	—N/a		15:35.06	6
Seema Kumari	10,000 m	—N/a		32:50.05	3rd place, bronze medalist(s)
Jyothi Yarraji	100 m hurdles	DNS		Did not advance	
Nandhini Kongan	100 m hurdles	13.48	4 Q	13.45	6
Anu Raghavan	400 m hurdles	55.84	2 Q	55.88; PB	5
Vithya Ramraj	400 m hurdles	55.73	2 Q	54.75; PB	3rd place, bronze medalist(s)
Ankita Dhyani	3000 m steeplechase	—N/a		9:19.24; PB	4
Parul Chaudhary	3000 m steeplechase	—N/a		9:08.67; PB	3rd place, bronze medalist(s)

Relay events

Athlete	Event	Heats		Final	
Athlete	Event	Result	Rank	Result	Rank
Dharmveer Choudhary; Jay Kumar; Manu T. S. Rajesh Ramesh; Vishal T. K. Reserve: Mohammed Ashfaq	Men's 4 × 400 m relay	3:01.49	1 Q	3:01.61	3rd place, bronze medalist(s)
Abinaya Rajarajan; Sneha Gowda; Srabani Nanda; Sudeshna Shivankar; Tamanna Dhankheri	Women's 4 × 100 m relay	43.65; SB	1 Q	43.57; SB	4
Kiran Pahal; Poovamma Machettira; Prachi Choudhary; Vithya Ramraj Reserves: Ansa Babu; Neeru Pathak; Rashdeep Kaur; Saloni Nagar	Women's 4 × 400 m relay	—N/a		3:29.69	1st place, gold medalist(s)
Abinaya Rajarajan; Animesh Kujur; Gurindervir Singh; Harita Bhadra; Sneha Gowda Reserves: Pranav Gurav; Tamanna Dhankheri; Unnathi Aiyappa	Mixed 4 × 100 m relay	41.54	2 Q	41.06 SB	3rd place, bronze medalist(s)
Manu T. S. Poovamma Machettira; Vishal T. K. Vithya Ramraj; Jay Kumar; Kiran Pahal	Mixed 4 × 400 m relay	3:16.23	2 Q	3:14.46	2nd place, silver medalist(s)

Road events

Athlete	Event	Final	
Athlete	Event	Result	Rank
Kartik Karkera	Men's marathon	2:22:41	17
Sawan Barwal	Men's marathon	2:11:37; PB	2nd place, silver medalist(s)
Manju Rani	Women's 20 km walk	3:40:17	6
Priyanka Goswami	Women's 20 km walk	DSQ	

Field events
Men

Athlete	Event	Qualification		Final	
Athlete	Event	Result	Rank	Result	Rank
Aadarsh Ram	High jump	—N/a		2.05	13
Sarvesh Kushare	High jump	—N/a		2.25	2nd place, silver medalist(s)
Murali Sreeshankar	Long jump	7.84	2 Q	8.07	2nd place, silver medalist(s)
David Solomon	Long jump	7.62	7 Q	7.70	7
Karthik Unnikrishnan	Triple jump	—N/a		16.02	6
Praveen Chithravel	Triple jump	—N/a		NM	DNF
Karanveer Singh	Shot put	—N/a		18.40	10
Tajinderpal Singh Toor	Shot put	—N/a		20.64	2nd place, silver medalist(s)
Damneet Singh	Hammer throw	—N/a		67.56	9
Praveen Kumar	Hammer throw	—N/a		65.24	11
Dev Meena	Pole vault	—N/a		5.50 PB	7
Kuldeep Kumar	Pole vault	—N/a		5.35	10
Rohit Yadav	Javelin throw	—N/a		84.35	3rd place, bronze medalist(s)
Yashvir Singh	Javelin throw	—N/a		85.72; PB	2nd place, silver medalist(s)

Women

Athlete	Event	Final	
Athlete	Event	Result	Rank
Pooja Singh	High jump	1.84	3rd place, bronze medalist(s)
Supriya Basavaraju	High jump	1.75	12
Ancy Sojan	Long jump	6.53	2nd place, silver medalist(s)
Shaili Singh	Long jump	6.42	4
Asha Ilango	Triple jump	13.83	4
Niharika Vashisht	Triple jump	13.00	10
Krishna Menon	Shot put	16.57	5
Manpreet Kaur	Shot put	17.17	3rd place, bronze medalist(s)
Sanya Yadav	Discus throw	49.90	8
Seema Kaliramna	Discus throw	59.88 PB	4
Anushka Yadav	Hammer throw	64.56	5
Tanya Chaudhary	Hammer throw	65.35 PB	4
Baranica Elangovan	Pole vault	4.15	3rd place, bronze medalist(s)
Sindhushree Ganesh	Pole vault	NM	DNF

Combined events
Men

Athlete	Event	Category	100 m	LJ	SP	HJ	400 m	110H	DT	PV	JT	1,500 m	Total	Rank
Tejaswin Shankar	Decathlon	Result	10.98	7.53	13.16	2.18	48.59	14.33	36.77	4.30	53.37	4:33.09	7934	3rd place, bronze medalist(s)
Tejaswin Shankar	Decathlon	Points	865	942	677	973	881	932	599	702	639	724	7934	3rd place, bronze medalist(s)
Thowfeeq Noushad	Decathlon	Result	11.02	7.37	10.76	1.88	52.81	DNS	DNF					
Thowfeeq Noushad	Decathlon	Points	856	903	531	696	690	DNS	DNF					

Women

Athlete	Event	Category	100H	HJ	SP	200 m	LJ	JT	800 m	Total	Rank
Anamika K. A.	Heptathlon	Result	14.80	1.74	11.15	25.96	5.62	29.78	2:18.06	5234	8
Anamika K. A.	Heptathlon	Points	868	903	605	801	735	472	850	5234	8
Pooja Sharma	Heptathlon	Result	14.61	1.71	11.44	26.27	5.46	38.98	2:16.43	5368	6
Pooja Sharma	Heptathlon	Points	894	867	624	774	688	648	873	5368	6

== Badminton ==
In June 2026, the Badminton Association of India announced a 20-member squad for the Games.

Singles

Athlete	Event	Round of 64	Round of 32	Round of 16	Quarterfinals	Semi-finals	Final	Rank
Athlete	Event	Opposition Score	Opposition Score	Opposition Score	Opposition Score	Opposition Score	Opposition Score	Rank
Ayush Shetty	Men	Bye	Tajibullayev (KAZ); W (21–7, 21–7)	Chou (TPE); L (16–21, 21–19, 17–21)	Did not advance			9
Lakshya Sen	Men	Bye	Loh (SIN); L (12–21, 21–15, 14–21)	Did not advance				17
P. V. Sindhu	Women	Bye	Chiu (TPE); W (21–19, 21–14)	Miyazaki (JPN); W (21–9, 21–13)	Chen (CHN); L (21–11, 18–21, 10–21)	Did not advance		5
Unnati Hooda	Women	Song (PRK); W (21–9, 21–10)	Wong (MAS); W (21–14, 20–22, 21–19)	Wardani (INA); W (21–19, 21–13)	Yamaguchi (JPN); L (16–21, 21–14, 17–21)	Did not advance		5

Doubles

Athlete	Event	Round of 32	Round of 16	Quarterfinals	Semi-finals	Final	Rank
Athlete	Event	Opposition Score	Opposition Score	Opposition Score	Opposition Score	Opposition Score	Rank
Chirag Shetty; Satwiksairaj Rankireddy	Men	Teeraratsakul / Sukphun (THA); L (21–12, 19–21, 14-21)	Did not advance				17
Arjun M. R. Hariharan Amsakarunan	Men	Alfian / Fikri (INA); L (14–21, 11-21)	Did not advance				17
Gayatri Gopichand; Treesa Jolly	Women	Tsang / Lui (HKG); W (21–16, 16–21, 21–16)	Matsumoto / Fukushima (JPN); W (24–22, 21–18)	Tan / Muralitharan (MAS); L (19–21, 9-21)	Did not advance		5
Kavipriya Selvam; Simran Singhi	Women	Kusuma / Puspita Sari (INA); L (9–21, 5–21)	Did not advance				17
Dhruv Kapila; Tanisha Crasto	Mixed	Ahmed / Razzaq (MDV); W (21–8, 21–7)	Lai / Goh (MAS); W (22–20, 24–22)	Feng / Huang (CHN); L (14–21, 21–18, 18–21)	Did not advance		5

Team

Athlete	Event	Round of 16	Quarterfinals	Semi-finals	Final	Rank
Athlete	Event	Opposition Score	Opposition Score	Opposition Score	Opposition Score	Rank
Arjun M. R. Ayush Shetty; Chirag Shetty; Dhruv Kapila; Hariharan Amsakarunan; Lakshya Sen; Prannoy H. S. Satwiksairaj Rankireddy; Srikanth Kidambi; Tharun Mannepalli	Men	Bangladesh; W 3–0	Japan; W 3–0	China; L 1–3	Did not advance	3rd place, bronze medalist(s)
Devika Sihag; Gayatri Gopichand; Isharani Baruah; Kavipriya Selvam; P. V. Sindhu; Simran Singhi; Tanisha Crasto; Tanvi Sharma; Treesa Jolly; Unnati Hooda	Women	Kazakhstan; W 3–0	Japan; L 1–3	Did not advance		5

Key

- W = Win
- L = Loss

== Boxing ==
The Boxing Federation of India organised national trials in May 2026, and announced a 11-member squad for the Games. The men's chief coach is C. A. Kuttappa.

Men

Boxer	Event	Round of 32	Round of 16	Quarterfinals	Semi-finals	Final	Rank
Boxer	Event	Opposition Result	Opposition Result	Opposition Result	Opposition Result	Opposition Result	Rank
Jadumani Singh	55 kg	Thapa (NEP); W 5–0	Paalam (PHI); L 0–3	Did not advance			9
Sachin Siwach	60 kg	Bye	Abu Jajeh (JOR); W 4–1	Kitamoto (JPN); L 0–5	Did not advance		5
Sumit Kundu	70 kg	Sinsiri (THA); W 5–0	Al-Sarray (IRQ); L RSC-I	Did not advance			9
Ankush Panghal	80 kg	—N/a	Vogel (BRN); W 5–0	Salimov (TJK); W 5–0	Erkinboev (UZB); W 4–1	Kim (KOR); W 4–0	1st place, gold medalist(s)
Kapil Pokhariya	90 kg	—N/a	Estaki (IRI); W 5–0	Kim (KOR); W 5–0	Khabibullaev (UZB); L 1–4	Did not advance	3rd place, bronze medalist(s)
Narender Berwal	+90 kg	—N/a	Bye	Saengtep (THA); W RSC	Oralbay (KAZ); L 0–5	Did not advance	3rd place, bronze medalist(s)

Women

Boxer	Event	Round of 32	Round of 16	Quarterfinals	Semi-finals	Final	Rank
Boxer	Event	Opposition Result	Opposition Result	Opposition Result	Opposition Result	Opposition Result	Rank
Sakshi Chaudhary	51 kg	Villegas (PHI); W 5–0	Balkibekova (KAZ); L 2–3	Did not advance			9
Preeti Pawar	54 kg	Bye	Pang (PRK); L 0–5	Did not advance			9
Priya Ghanghas	60 kg	—N/a	Oh (KOR); W 5–0	Samadova (TJK); W 5–0	Yang (CHN); L 1–4	Did not advance	3rd place, bronze medalist(s)
Parveen Hooda	65 kg	—N/a	Nozimova (TJK); W WO	Khamidova (UZB); W 5–0	Li (CHN); W 5–0	Chen (TPE); W 3–2	1st place, gold medalist(s)
Lovlina Borgohain	75 kg	—N/a		Seong (KOR); W 5–0	Bogdanova (KAZ); W 3–2	Bao (CHN); W 5–0	1st place, gold medalist(s)

Key

- W = Win
- L = Loss
- RSC-I = Referee Stops Contest due to Injury
- WO = Walk Over

== Canoeing ==
Slalom

Athlete	Event	Heats		Quarter-final		Semi-final		Final		Overall rank
Athlete	Event	Time	Rank	Time	Rank	Time	Rank	Time	Rank	Overall rank
Hitesh Kewat	Men's K-1	118.22	8 Q	—N/a		184.89	14	Did not advance		16
Pradhyumna Singh	Men's K-1	127.70	10 Q	—N/a		137.74	11 Q	125.21	6	
Hitesh Kewat	Men's Kayak cross	FLT	18	Did not advance						18
Pradhyumna Singh	Men's Kayak cross	79.85	9 Q	—N/a	4	Did not advance				6
Pallavi Jagtap	Women's C-1	224.20	7 Q	—N/a		211.77	8 Q	DSQ	7	
Rina Sen	Women's C-1	342.72	9 Q	—N/a		269.99	9	Did not advance		9
Shikha Chouhan	Women's K-1	344.87	11 Q	—N/a		246.16	10 Q	193.31	7	
Shikha Chouhan	Women's Kayak cross	83.31	8 Q	—N/a	3	Did not advance				7

Sprint

Athlete	Event	Heats		Semi-final		Final A / B		Overall rank
Athlete	Event	Time	Rank	Time	Rank	Time	Rank	Overall rank
Megha Pradeep	Women's C-1 200 m	49.675	5 SF	51.093	4	Did not advance		11
Harshwardhan Singh Shaktawat	Men's K-1 500 m	—N/a		1:50.543	4 FB	1:52.458	1	10
Gyaneshwor Singh Philem; Raju Rawat	Men's C-2 500 m	—N/a				1:56.121	9	
Neha Devi Leichonbam; Megha Pradeep	Women's C-2 500 m	2:08.713	5 SF	2:08.306	4	Did not advance		10
Raju Rawat; Neha Devi Leichonbam	Mixed C-2 500 m	—N/a				2:00.891	8	
Prohit Baroi; Prasanna Kumar C. S.	Men's K-2 500 m	1:41.141	5 SF	1:40.308	5 FB	1:40.411	3	12
Soniya Devi Phairembam; Parvathy Geetha	Women's K-2 500 m	2:02.538	6 SF	2:01.020	5	Did not advance		11
Prasanna Kumar C. S. Parvathy Geetha	Mixed K-2 500 m	1:52.676	SF	1:53.031	2 FA	1:53.994	9	
Naocha Singh Laitonjam; Varinder Singh; Arun Singh Oinam; Harshwardhan Singh Shaktawat	Men's K-4 500 m	1:29.447	3 FA	—N/a		1:28.982	7	
Soniya Devi Phairembam; Dhanamanjuri Devi Khwairakpam; Parvathy Geetha; Pooja	Women's K-4 500 m	—N/a				1:45.670	8	

Key

- SF = Qualified for Semifinal
- FA = Qualified for Final A (medal race)
- FB = Qualified for Final B

== Cricket ==
Both the men's and women's cricket teams qualified for the Games as full members of the International Cricket Council. The Board of Control for Cricket in India announced the 15-member men's squad on 6 June 2026, which was captained by Shreyas Iyer and coached by VVS Laxman. The women's squad, led by Harmanpreet Kaur, was announced on 30 June. Subsequently, Harshit Rana and Varun Chakravarthy were replaced by Yash Thakur and Vipraj Nigam respectively due to injuries and Nitish Kumar Reddy was withdrawn from the men's squad. In the women's squad, Jemimah Rodrigues was ruled out due to an injury and replaced by Pratika Rawal. The men's team received a bye in the preliminary stage and directly qualified for the knockout stage.

Team	Event	Preliminary stage			Quarterfinal	Semi-final	Final	
Team	Event	Opposition Result	Opposition Result	Rank	Opposition Result	Opposition Result	Opposition Result	Rank
Men's team	Men's tournament	Bye			Afghanistan; W (Note: India declared winner by virtue of its higher seeding) Aban	Sri Lanka; W by 124 runs	Pakistan; W by 19 runs	1st place, gold medalist(s)
Women's team	Women's tournament	—N/a			Japan; W by 8 wickets	Bangladesh; W by 114 runs	Sri Lanka; W by 147 runs	1st place, gold medalist(s)

Men's tournament

Squad

Head coach: (India) VVS Laxman

- Shreyas Iyer (c)
- Tilak Varma (vc)
- Abhishek Sharma
- Arshdeep Singh
- Axar Patel
- Ishan Kishan (wk)
- Jasprit Bumrah
- Ravi Bishnoi
- Sanju Samson (wk)
- Shivam Dube
- Vaibhav Sooryavanshi
- Vipraj Nigam
- Washington Sundar
- Yash Thakur

Fixtures

Quarterfinal 2
28 September 2026
14:00
Scorecard

Afghanistan	v	India

Match abandoned
Kōrogi Sports Park, Nisshin
Umpires: Prageeth Rambukwella (SL) and Gazi Sohel (Ban)

- No toss.
- No play was possible due to rain.
- India advanced by virtue of being the higher-seeded team.

Semifinal 2
1 October 2026
14:00
Scorecard

India; 169/7 (20 overs)	v	Sri Lanka; 45 (9.5 overs)
Ishan Kishan 80* (46); Sahan Arachchige 2/28 (4 overs)		Nuwanidu Fernando 15 (11); Abhishek Sharma 2/2 (0.5 over)

India won by 124 runs
Kōrogi Sports Park, Nisshin
Umpires: Faisal Afridi (Pak) and Gazi Sohel (Ban)

- Sri Lanka won the toss and elected to field.
- Sohan de Livera, Sineth Jayawardena and Wanuja Sahan (SL) all made their T20I debuts.
- This was Sri Lanka's lowest total in T20Is.

Gold medal match

3 October 2026
14:00
Scorecard

India; 211/6 (20 overs)	v	Pakistan; 192/6 (20 overs)
Abhishek Sharma 61 (28); Arafat Minhas 2/25 (3 overs)		Hassan Nawaz 96 (51); Axar Patel 2/29 (4 overs); Washington Sundar 2/29 (4 overs)

India won by 19 runs
Kōrogi Sports Park, Nisshin
Umpires: Prageeth Rambukwella (SL) and Gazi Sohel (Ban)

- India won the toss and elected to bat.
- Saad Masood (Pak) made his T20I debut.

Women's tournament

Squad

Head coach: (India) Amol Muzumdar

- Harmanpreet Kaur (c)
- Smriti Mandhana (vc)
- Arundhati Reddy
- Bharti Fulmali
- Deepti Sharma
- Gunalan Kamalini (wk)
- Kranti Gaud
- Nandani Sharma
- Pratika Rawal
- Radha Yadav
- Renuka Singh Thakur
- Richa Ghosh (wk)
- Shafali Verma
- Shree Charani
- Shreyanka Patil

Fixtures
Quarter final

Quarter-final 4
18 September 2026
14:00
Scorecard

Japan; 57 (19.5 overs)	v	India; 59/2 (5 overs)
Ayaka Kato-Stafford 25 (47); Shree Charani 4/10 (4 overs)		Shafali Verma 40* (15); Nonoha Yasumoto 1/8 (2 overs)

India won by 8 Wickets
Kōrogi Sports Park, Nisshin
Umpires: Shathira Jakir (Ban) and Shivani Mishra (Qat)

- India won the toss and elected to field.
- This was the first time India and Japan faced each other in WT20Is.

Semi final

Semi-final 2
20 September 2026
14:00
Scorecard

India; 195/4 (20 overs)	v	Bangladesh; 81 (15.4 overs)
Shafali Verma 100* (49); Sanjida Akter Meghla 1/25 (4 overs)		Dilara Akter 27 (23); Deepti Sharma 3/7 (2.4 overs)

India won by 114 runs
Kōrogi Sports Park, Nisshin
Umpires: Shivani Mishra (Qat) and Nimali Perera (SL)

- India won the toss and elected to bat.
- Shafali Verma (Ind) scored her maiden century in T20Is.
- Smriti Mandhana (Ind) became the leading run-scorer in women's T20Is (4788 runs), surpassing Suzie Bates' 4758 runs.

Gold medal match

22 September 2026
14:00
Scorecard

India; 216/3 (20 overs)	v	Sri Lanka; 69 (15.4 overs)
Smriti Mandhana 79 (45); Chamudi Praboda 1/34 (4 overs)		Chamari Athapaththu 29 (21); Deepti Sharma 3/6 (4 overs)

India won by 147 runs
Kōrogi Sports Park, Nisshin
Umpires: Saleema Imtiaz (Pak) and Shathira Jakir (Ban)

- India won the toss and elected to bat.
- India won the gold medal.

== Cycling ==
Keirin

Athlete	Event	First round		Repechage		Semi-final		Final / Classification		Overall rank
Athlete	Event	Time	Rank	Time	Rank	Time	Rank	Time	Rank	Overall rank
David Elkatohchoongo	Men	10.929	3 R	10.497	3 Q	10.578	5 F7-12	11.936	6	12
Ronaldo Laitonjam	Men	10.802	5 R	11.930	6	Did not advance				18
Keerthi Chikka	Women	11.740	4 R	11.720	3 Q	12.196	5 F7-12	11.602	4	10
Sarita Kumari	Women	12.423	5 R	11.978	4	Did not advance				13

Madison

Athlete	Event	Points			Rank
Athlete	Event	Sprint	Lap	Total	Rank
Harshveer Sekhon; Vishvajit Singh	Men	1	–40	–39	8
Harshita Jakhar; Swasti Singh	Women	DNF			8

Omnium

Athlete	Event	Scratch Race		Tempo Race		Elimination Race		Points Race		Total	
Athlete	Event	Rank	Points	Rank	Points	Rank	Points	Rank	Points	Points	Rank
Harshveer Sekhon	Men	10	22	4	34	10	22	9	6	84	10
Harshita Jakhar	Women	12	18	11	–20	12	18	10	–20	–4	11

Pursuit

Athlete	Event	Qualification		First Round	Final / BM	Rank
Athlete	Event	Time	Rank	Time	Opponent Result	Rank
Meenakshi Rohilla; Pooja Danole; Harshita Jakhar; Swasti Singh	Women's Team	4:45.151	5 Q	4:46.950	Did not advance	5

Sprint
Individual

Athlete	Event	Qualification		Round of 32	Repechage	Round of 16	Repechage	Quarterfinals	Semi-finals	Final		Overall rank
Athlete	Event	Time	Rank	Opposition Time	Opposition Time	Opposition Time	Opposition Time	Opposition Time	Opposition Time	Opposition Time	Rank	Overall rank
Ronaldo Laitonjam	Men's Individual	10.052	15 Q	Li (CHN); L 10.620–10.402	Kurdidi (KAZ); L 10.669–10.510	Did not advance						15
David Elkatohchoongo	Men's Individual	9.996	14 Q	Awang (MAS); L 10.992–10.939	Yung (HKG); L 11.043–10.852	Did not advance						14
Keerthi Chikka	Women's Individual	11.237	12 Q	Sakai (JPN); L 11.847–11.598	Chen (TPE); L 11.960–11.911	Did not advance						13
Celestina Chelobroy	Women's Individual	11.380	14 Q	Jiang (CHN); L 13.331–11.142	Kim (KOR); L 12.043–11.958	Did not advance						14

Team

Athlete	Event	Qualification		First Round	Final / BM		Overall rank
Athlete	Event	Time	Rank	Opposition Time	Opposition Time	Rank	Overall rank
Ronaldo Laitonjam; David Elkatohchoongo; Jemsh Singh Keithellakpam; Rojit Singh Yanglem	Men's Team	44.895	7 Q	China (CHN); L 44.374–42.348	Did not advance		7
Triyasha Paul; Sarita Kumari; Celestina Chelobroy; Keerthi Chikka	Women's Team	50.414	6 Q	Chinese Taipei (TPE); L 50.431–49.504	Did not advance		6

Key

- W = Win
- L = Loss
- R = Qualified for the repechage round
- Q = Qualified for the next round

== Equestrian ==
The Equestrian Federation of India selected a 12-member squad for the three disciplines at the Games in June 2026. The show jumping team was omitted from the final list, which reduced the squad strength to eight. Aahan Kumar, who was supposed to compete in the eventing competitions, was unable to participate after his horse, Bolivar Gio Granno, tested positive for Piroplasmosis a few weeks before the Games.

Dressage

Athlete	Horse	Event	Qualifier I		Qualifier II			Final	
Athlete	Horse	Event	Score	Rank	Score	Overall	Rank	Score	Rank
Gaurav Pundir	Milli	Individual	65.794	25	EL	DNF		Did not advance	
Hriday Chheda	Dono Di Maggio	Individual	67.353	14	67.706	135.059	11 Q	72.680	8
Jai Sud	Goofy La Perla	Individual	66.559	20	67.000	133.559	13 Q	71.490	9
Shruti Vora	Magnanimous	Individual	68.059	9	61.782	129.941	24	Did not advance	
Gaurav Pundir; Hriday Chheda; Jai Sud; Shruti Vora	See above	Team (Note: The best three scores in the first qualifier will be taken into account for the team score if there are more than three horses.)	201.971	4	—N/a				

Key

- Q = Qualified for the next round

Eventing

Athlete	Horse	Event	Dressage		Jumping			Cross-country		
Athlete	Horse	Event	Penalties	Rank	Penalties	Overall	Rank	Penalties	Overall	Rank
Arjan Nagra	Cooley Goodwood	Individual	38.20	23	EL	DNF				
Ashish Limaye	Willy Be Dun	Individual	35.50	14	0.00	35.50	6	9.00	44.50	12
Fouaad Mirza	Camouflage 38	Individual	38.70	26	8.00	46.70	24	RT	DNF	
Arjan Nagra; Ashish Limaye; Fouaad Mirza	See above	Team	112.4	7	EL	DNF				

== Esports ==
A total of 15 athletes were selected to represent the nation across four events in esports.

Gamer	Event	Group stage					Selection	Round of 16	Quarter-final	Semi-final	Final	Rank
Gamer	Event	Opposition Score	Opposition Score	Opposition Score	Opposition Score	Rank	Opposition Score	Opposition Score	Opposition Score	Opposition Score	Opposition Score	Rank
Chinmay Sahoo; Danial Patel	eFootball	Uzbekistan; D 0–0	Mongolia; W WO	—N/a		2	—N/a			Did not advance		9
Ahmed Israr; Akash Shandilya; Akshaj Shenoy; Mihir Ranjan; Rahul Bisht; Sanidhya Malik	League of Legends	Hong Kong; L 0–1	South Korea; L 0–1	Chinese Taipei; L 0–1	—N/a	4	—N/a			Did not advance		5
Adnan Badshah; Deepkumar Patel; Dipjyoti Nath; Reuben Fernandes; Rudra Nayak; Sai Krishna Nalluri	Pokémon Unite	South Korea; L 0–2	Japan; L 0–2	—N/a		3 q	Hong Kong; L 1–2	—N/a	Did not advance			9
Paritosh Sachdeva	Puyo Puyo Champions	Ganbold (MGL); W 3–0	Koh (SGP); W 3–2	Kuo (TPE); L 0–3	Wongkitikun (THA); L 2–3	3 Q	—N/a	Kang (KOR); L 0–5	Did not advance			5

Key

- W = Win
- L = Loss
- D = Draw
- Q = Qualified for the next round
- q = Qualified for the selection round

== Fencing ==
Individual

Athlete	Event	Preliminaries						Round of 32	Round of 16	Quarterfinals	Semi-finals	Final
Athlete	Event	Opposition Score	Opposition Score	Opposition Score	Opposition Score	Opposition Score	Rank	Opposition Score	Opposition Score	Opposition Score	Opposition Score	Opposition Score
Taniksha Khatri	Women's épée	Damdinpurev (MGL); W 5–3	Sangngio (THA); L 4–5	Bakaldina (KAZ); L 1–5	Alhosani (UAE); W 5–4	Lim (KOR); W 5–4	16 Q	Sangngio (THA); W 15–10	Song (KOR); L 9–15	Did not advance		
Mitva Chaudhari	Women's épée	Koh (SGP); L 2–5	Nguyen (VIE); W 5–4	Khakimova (UZB); W 5–3	Larrazabal (PHI); L 3–4	Tang (CHN); L 4–5	18 Q	Yang (CHN); L 14–15	Did not advance			
Sachin	Men's foil	Khan (PAK); W 5–0	Chen (TPE); L 2–5	Nurumov (KAZ); W 5–3	Youn (KOR); L 0–5	Narmandakh (MGL); W 5–1	18 Q	Semyonov (KAZ); L 9–15	Did not advance			
Hemash Singh Sanasam	Men's foil	Tan (SGP); L 2–5	Iimura (JPN); W 5–1	Tranquilan (PHI); W 5–2	Cheong (MAC); L 2–5	Al Shuaibi (OMA); W 5–1	17 Q	Nurumov (KAZ); L 9–15	Did not advance			
Mina Devi Naorem	Women's foil	Cheng (HKG); L 2–5	Ueno (JPN); L 1–5	Winona (INA); L 4–5	Catantan (PHI); W 5–3	Volobueva (UZB); L 1–5	20 Q	Park (KOR); L 3–15	Did not advance			
Joys Ashitha	Women's foil	Ku (MAC); W 5–0	Al Siyabi (OMA); W 5–1	Berthier (SGP); L 3–5	Kikuchi (JPN); L 1–5	Huang (CHN); L 3–5	18 Q	Gnoyeva (KAZ); L 14–15	Did not advance			
Gisho Kumaresan	Men's sabre	Zhailybay (KAZ); W 5–3	Chan (HKG); L 3–5	Kokubo (JPN); L 2–5	Alobaid (KSA); W 5–3	Nguyen (VIE); L 2–5	12 Q	Geoffroy (LAO); W 15–8	Sarkissyan (KAZ); L 11–15	Did not advance		
Karan Singh	Men's sabre	Srinualnad (THA); L 2–5	Shen (CHN); L 1–5	Tsumori (JPN); L 3–5	Tahla (JOR); W 5–2	—N/a	24 Q	Luo (CHN); L 14–15	Did not advance			
Bhavani Devi	Women's sabre	Kim (KOR); L 1–5	Sarybay (KAZ); W 5–4	Sazanjian (IRI); L 4–5	Dayibekova (UZB); L 4–5	Somphao (THA); W 5–2	14 Q	Tugsjargal (MGL); W 15–8	Rao (CHN); L 5–15	Did not advance		
Shreya Gupta	Women's sabre	Dalmacio (PHI); W 5–2	Anggraini (INA); W 5–1	Heng (SGP); W 5–4	Emura (JPN); L 0–5	Pan (CHN); L 3–5	11 Q	Bye	Jeon (KOR); L 6–15	Did not advance		

Team

Athlete	Event	Round of 16	Quarterfinals	Semi-finals	Final	
Athlete	Event	Opposition Score	Opposition Score	Opposition Score	Opposition Score	Rank
Mitva Chaudhari; Yashkeerat Kaur Hayer; Taniksha Khatri; Prachi Lohan	Women's épée	Uzbekistan (UZB); L 29–45	Did not advance			
Sachin; Aditya Badser; Tejas Patil; Hemash Singh Sanasam	Men's foil	Hong Kong (HKG); L 27–45	Did not advance			
Kanupriya Chawla; Mina Devi Naorem; Joys Stalinraj; Sonia Devi Waikhom	Women's foil	Indonesia (INA); W 45–24	Japan (JPN); L 14–45	Did not advance		
Lakshay Badser; Gisho Kumaresan; Karan Singh; Vishal Thapar	Men's sabre	Philippines (PHI); W 45–27	South Korea (KOR); L 25–45	Did not advance		
Bhavani Devi; Shreya Gupta; Jefarlin Jani; Shruti Joshi	Women's sabre	Indonesia (INA); W 45–23	Uzbekistan (UZB); L 35–45	Did not advance		

Key

- W = Win
- L = Loss
- Q = Qualified for the next round

== Field hockey ==
The Indian men's and women's teams qualified for the Games by finishing in the top six in the previous edition, with the men's team entering the tournament as the defending champions. Hockey India announced the 20-member women's team for the Games on 10 July 2026, and 20-member men's squad on 30 July.

Team	Event	Group Stage						Semi-final	Final	
Team	Event	Opposition Result	Opposition Result	Opposition Result	Opposition Result	Opposition Result	Rank	Opposition Result	Opposition Result	Rank
Men's team	Men's	Indonesia; W 13–1	Sri Lanka; W 16–1	South Korea; W 8–2	Japan; W 2–0	Bangladesh; W 10–0	1 Q	Pakistan; W 4–3	Malaysia; W 5–1	1st place, gold medalist(s)
Women's team	Women's	Uzbekistan; W 19–0	Indonesia; W 17–1	Thailand; W 20–1	Japan; W 3–1	Singapore; W 7–0	1 Q	South Korea; W 2–0	China; W 1–0	1st place, gold medalist(s)

Key

- W = Win
- L = Loss
- Q = Qualified for the next round

Men's tournament

Squad

Head coach: (South Africa) Craig Fulton

- Harmanpreet Singh
- Dilpreet Singh
- Shilanand Lakra
- Sukhjeet Singh
- Mandeep Singh
- Abhishek Nain
- Rajinder Singh
- Raj Kumar Pal
- Hardik Singh
- Manpreet Singh
- Nilakanta Sharma
- Vivek Prasad
- Jarmanpreet Singh
- Amit Rohidas
- Jugraj Singh
- Sanjay Rana
- Sumit Kumar
- Yashdeep Siwach
- Mohith H. S.
- Suraj Karkera

Preliminary round

Pos	Team	Pld	W	D	L	GF	GA	GD	Pts	Qualification
1	India	5	5	0	0	49	4	+45	15	Semi-finals
2	South Korea	5	4	0	1	20	10	+10	12	Semi-finals
3	Japan (H)	5	3	0	2	29	7	+22	9	Fifth place classification
4	Bangladesh	5	2	0	3	9	23	−14	6	Fifth place classification
5	Sri Lanka	5	1	0	4	6	38	−32	3	Ninth place game
6	Indonesia	5	0	0	5	6	37	−31	0	Eleventh place game

Source: FIH
Rules for classification: 1) points; 2) matches won; 3) goal difference; 4) goals for; 5) head-to-head result; 6) field goals for.
(H) Hosts

20 September 2026
15:00

India	13–1	Indonesia
Lakra 6', 35'; Abhishek 12'; Dilpreet 18', 19', 37', 49'; Rajinder 19'; Mandeep 21'; Harmanpreet 28'; Sukhjeet 38', 48'; Jugraj 46'	Report	Al Ardh 33'

Gifu Prefectural Green Stadium
Umpires:
Liu Xiaoying (CHN)
Zhou Fuyi (CHN)

22 September 2026
19:00

India	16–1	Sri Lanka
Mandeep 5'; Jugraj 10', 22', 42', 53'; Abhishek 11', 17', 49'; Harmanpreet 16', 45'; Sukhjeet 29'; Dilpreet 30', 38', 55'; Manpreet 31'; Prasad 36'	Report	Rathnayake 50'

Gifu Prefectural Green Stadium
Umpires:
James Unkles (AUS)
Khalid Hussain (HKG)

24 September 2026
15:00

South Korea	2–8	India
Kim J. 42'; Kim Y. 52'	Report	Lakra 4'; Sukhjeet 10'; Harmanpreet 11'; Abhishek 15', 38'; Dilpreet 26', 32'; Rajinder 60'

Gifu Prefectural Green Stadium
Umpires:
Coen van Bunge (NED)
Rawi Anbananthan (MAS)

26 September 2026
17:00

Japan	0–2	India
	Report	Abhishek 15'; Harmanpreet 40'

Gifu Prefectural Green Stadium
Umpires:
Lim Hong-Zhen (SGP)
Sean Rapaport (RSA)

28 September 2026
19:30

India	10–0	Bangladesh
Abhishek 3'; Jugraj 22'; Harmanpreet 27', 40', 45'; Sukhjeet 32'; Lakra 44', 45'; Sanjay 59'; Mandeep 60'	Report

Gifu Prefectural Green Stadium
Umpires:
Daulet Urmanov (KAZ)
Mazin Al-Shukaili (OMA)

Semi-final

1 October 2026
16:30

India	4–3	Pakistan
Harmanpreet 5', 13'; Sukhjeet 23'; Abhishek 60'	Report	Mahmood 30'; Shahid 45'; Rana 49'

Gifu Prefectural Green Stadium
Umpires:
You Hyo-sik (KOR)
Rawi Anbananthan (MAS)

Gold medal match

3 October 2026
19:00

India	5–1	Malaysia
Harmanpreet 11', 57'; Jugraj 23'; Hardik 42'; Lakra 54'	Report	Silverius 14'

Gifu Prefectural Green Stadium
Umpires:
Sean Rapaport (RSA)
Lim Hong-Zhen (SGP)

Women's tournament

Squad

Head coach: (Netherlands) Sjoerd Marijne

- Salima Tete (c)
- Lalremsiami Hmarzote
- Rutuja Pisal
- Navneet Kaur
- Deepika Sehrawat
- Ishika Chaudhary
- Baljeet Kaur
- Beauty Dungdung
- Nikki Pradhan
- Sakshi Rana
- Sunelita Toppo
- Neha Goyal
- Deepika Soreng
- Ishika
- Sushila Chanu Pukhrambam
- Lalthantluangi
- Jyoti Rumavat
- Shilpi Dabas
- Savita Punia (GK)
- Bichu Devi Kharibam (GK)

Preliminary round

Pos	Team	Pld	W	D	L	GF	GA	GD	Pts	Qualification
1	India	5	5	0	0	66	3	+63	15	Semi-finals
2	Japan (H)	5	4	0	1	23	4	+19	12	Semi-finals
3	Thailand	5	2	0	3	6	25	−19	6	Fifth place classification
4	Indonesia	5	2	0	3	6	27	−21	6	Fifth place classification
5	Singapore	5	1	0	4	4	18	−14	3	Ninth place game
6	Uzbekistan	5	1	0	4	5	33	−28	3	Eleventh place game

Source: FIH
Rules for classification: 1) points; 2) matches won; 3) goal difference; 4) goals for; 5) head-to-head result; 6) field goals for.
(H) Hosts

20 September 2026
11:00

India	19–0	Uzbekistan
Lalremsiami 7'; Deepika 8', 22', 25', 33', 36', 38', 41', 54'; Ishika 11', 42', 54'; Baljeet 12'; Neha 18'; Navneet 23', 45'; Lalthantluangi 43', 51'; Rana 43'	Report

Gifu Prefectural Green Stadium
Umpires:
Valerie Koh (SGP)
Liu Yu-Chen (TPE)

21 September 2026
13:00

India	17–1	Indonesia
Deepika 8', 28', 40'; Toppo 11', 30'; Lalremsiami 12', 16'; Pisal 15', 20', 38'; Rana 25', 57'; Tete 34'; Navneet 35', 56', 57'; Ishika 36'	Report	Aditiya 32'

Gifu Prefectural Green Stadium
Umpires:
Shahiela Johari (MAS)
Emi Yamada (JPN)

23 September 2026
15:00

Thailand	1–20	India
Samanso 57'	Report	Deepika 2', 8', 9', 24', 33', 36', 39', 51', 57'; Navneet 4', 29', 35', 51'; Pisal 10', 11', 47'; Neha 19'; Lalremsiami 26'; Rana 29'; Tete 45'

Gifu Prefectural Green Stadium
Umpires:
Zarina Ilyassova (KAZ)
Cookie Tan (SGP)

25 September 2026
11:00

Japan	1–3	India
Kobayakawa 46'	Report	Lalremsiami 5'; Ishika 30'; Navneet 36'

Gifu Prefectural Green Stadium
Umpires:
Kim Yoon-seon (KOR)
Valerie Koh (SGP)

27 September 2026
19:00

India	7–0	Singapore
Tete 17'; Toppo 22', 24'; Lalremsiami 26'; Pisal 29'; Pradhan 35'; Deepika 55'	Report

Gifu Prefectural Green Stadium
Umpires:
Laurine Delforge (BEL)
Zarina Ilyassova (KAZ)

Semi-final

30 September 2026
19:00

India	2–0	South Korea
Ishika 44'; Tete 48'	Report

Gifu Prefectural Green Stadium
Umpires:
Aleisha Neumann (AUS)
Liu Xiaoying (CHN)

Gold medal match

2 October 2026
20:00

China	0–1	India
	Report	Lalremsiami 10'

Gifu Prefectural Green Stadium
Umpires:
Kim Yoon-seon (KOR)
Laurine Delforge (BEL)

== Golf ==
The Indian Golf Union announced a six-member squad for the Games in June 2026.

Individual

Golfer	Event	Round 1	Round 2	Round 3	Round 4	Total		
Golfer	Event	Score	Score	Score	Score	Score	To Par	Rank
Saptak Talwar	Men	66	68	71	67	271	–9	T6
Veer Ahlawat	Men	71	68	65	66	271	–9	T6
Yuvraj Sandhu	Men	71	69	71	70	281	+1	T24
Aditi Ashok	Women	71	74	70	67	282	+2	14
Diksha Dagar	Women	71	73	71	77	292	+12	T23
Pranavi Urs	Women	66	63	66	70	265	–15	1st place, gold medalist(s)

Team

Golfer	Event (Note: The best two of the three scores of the individual golfers will be considered for the team score in each round.)	Round 1	Round 2	Round 3	Round 4	Total		
Golfer	Event	Score	Score	Score	Score	Score	To Par	Rank
Saptak Talwar; Veer Ahlawat; Yuvraj Sandhu	Men	137	136	136	133	542	–18	6
Aditi Ashok; Diksha Dagar; Pranavi Urs	Women	137	136	136	137	546	–14	2nd place, silver medalist(s)

== Gymnastics ==
Pranati Nayak was the lone gymnast representing India at the Games.

Women's artistic

Athlete	Event	Vault		Uneven bars		Balance beam		Floor		Final	
Athlete	Event	Score	Rank	Score	Rank	Score	Rank	Score	Rank	Score	Rank
Pranati Nayak	All-around	12.916	7 Q	DNS						DNF	

Finals

Athlete	Event	Score	Rank
Pranati Nayak	Vault	13.100	6

== Judo ==
The judo selection trials for the Games were held in February 2026 at the K. D. Jadhav Indoor Hall in Delhi, with 12 athletes qualifying. However, the sports ministry later excluded several athletes (nine) from the initial list including 2026 Commonwealth Games medalists Harsh Singh and Unnati Sharma, and approved a final list of three judokas for the Games.

Athlete	Event	Round of 16	Quarterfinal	Semi-final	Repechage	Final / BM	Rank
Athlete	Event	Opposition Result	Opposition Result	Opposition Result	Opposition Result	Opposition Result	Rank
Asmita Dey	Women's 48 kg	Ha (VIE); W 100s1–0s2	Abuzhakynova (KAZ); L 0s2–100s1	Did not advance	Wong (HKG); W 10s1–0s1	Ganbaatar (MGL); L 0s1–10s1	5
Yamini Mourya	Women's 57 kg	Bu-Qahoos (QAT); W 100–0	Terbish (MGL); L 0s1–2	Did not advance	Shirakane (JPN); L 100–0s3	Did not advance	7
Inunganbi Takhellambam	Women's 70 kg	Shrestha (NEP); W 100–0	Song (PRK); L 0s2–100s1	Did not advance	Tang (CHN); W 100–0	Uran-Ulzii (MGL); L 0–12	5

Key

- W = Win
- L = Loss
- s1 = Shido 1
- s2 = Shido 2
- s3 = Hansoku-make resulting from 'progressive' penalties awarded during the contest

== Mixed martial arts ==
Traditional

Athlete	Event	Round of 16	Quarterfinal	Semi-final	Final	Rank
Athlete	Event	Opposition Result	Opposition Result	Opposition Result	Opposition Result	Rank
Varun Sanyal	Men's 77 kg	Bye	DSQ	Did not advance		
Suchika Tariyal	Women's 60 kg	—N/a	Baigalmaa (MGL); W 2–0	Teo (SGP); L 0–2	Did not advance	3rd place, bronze medalist(s)

Key

- W = Win
- L = Loss

== Kabaddi ==
The Amateur Kabaddi Federation of India announced the 12-member men's and women's squads in August 2026.

Team	Event	Group stage					Semi-final	Final	
Team	Event	Opposition Score	Opposition Score	Opposition Score	Opposition Score	Rank	Opposition Score	Opposition Score	Rank
Men's team	Men's	Japan; W 49–24	South Korea; W 63–31	Bangladesh; W 48–25	Chinese Taipei; W 37–21	1 Q	Thailand; W 66–28	Iran; W 40–34	1st place, gold medalist(s)
Women's team	Women's	Bangladesh; W 42–21	Iran; W 37–23	Japan; W 50–25	—N/a	1 Q	Nepal; W 48–24	Iran; W 37–34	1st place, gold medalist(s)

Key

- W = Win
- L = Loss
- Q = Qualified for the next round

Men's tournament

Squad

Head coach: (India) Rambir Singh Khokhar

- Sunil Kumar (c)
- Ankit Jaglan
- Arjun Deshwal
- Ashu Malik
- Aslam Inamdar
- Ayan Lohchab
- Devank Dalal
- Gaurav Khatri
- Jaideep Dahiya
- Pawan Sehrawat
- Rahul Sethpal
- Sumit Sangwan

Women's tournament

Squad

Head coach: (India) Tejaswini Bai

- Pushpa Rana (c)
- Bhavna Thakur
- Jyoti Thakur
- Manisha Kumari
- Nikita Kumari
- Pinki Roy
- Pooja Hathwala
- Raj Rani
- Ritu Negi
- Ritu Sheoran
- Sanju Devi
- Sonali Shingate

== Karate ==
Two athletes were selected to represent the nation in karate.

Kumite

Athlete	Event	Round of 16	Quarter-finals	Semi-finals	Repechage	Final / BM	Rank
Athlete	Event	Opposition Result	Opposition Result	Opposition Result	Opposition Result	Opposition Result	Rank
Chetan Bhatt	Men's 84 kg	—N/a	Bye	Aljafari (JOR); L 0–8	Chung (TPE); L 1–1 (Note: Chung won by Senshu, the first scoring activity of the match.)	Did not advance	5
Alisha Choudhary	Women's 55 kg	Sanistyarani (INA); L 1–6	Did not advance				11

Key

- W = Win
- L = Loss

== Kurash ==
Athlete	Event	Round of 32	Round of 16	Quarterfinal	Semi-final	Final	Rank
Athlete	Event	Opposition Result	Opposition Result	Opposition Result	Opposition Result	Opposition Result	Rank
Vipin Kumar	Men's 66 kg	Bye	Yoon (KOR); L 0–3	Did not advance			9
Vishal	Men's +90 kg	—N/a	Bye	Yea-on (THA); L 0–5	Did not advance		5
Yash Chauhan	Men's +90 kg	—N/a	Mirmadov (IRI); L 0–10	Did not advance			9
Bharti	Women's 57 kg	Bye	Azarperivand (IRI); L 0–3	Did not advance			9
Sangita	Women's 57 kg	Quelino (PHI); L 0–10	Did not advance				17
Pincky Balhara	Women's 78 kg	—N/a	Bye	Lim (KOR); W 3–0	Mo (KOR); L 0–5	Did not advance	3rd place, bronze medalist(s)

== Rowing ==
Sculling

Athlete	Event	Heat		Final A / B	Rank
Athlete	Event	Time	Rank	Time	Rank
Balraj Panwar	Men's single	6:52.84	3 FA	6:54.80	4
Satnam Singh; Salman Khan	Men's double	6:15.63	2 FA	6:13.25	3rd place, bronze medalist(s)
Ujjwal Kumar Singh; Rohit	Men's lightweight double	6:51.30	4 FA	6:27.42	4
Jakar Khan; Salman Khan; Arvind Singh; Satnam Singh Ghurde	Men's quadruple	6:18.62	3 FA	5:52.17	5

Sweeping

Athlete	Event	Heat		Final A / B	Rank
Athlete	Event	Time	Rank	Time	Rank
Nitin Kumar; Jaswinder Singh	Men's pair	6:36.90	4 FB	6:46.84	7
Yogesh Kumar; Nitin Kumar; Jaswinder Singh; Babu Lal Yadav	Men's four	6:30.47	4	Did not advance	7
Poonam; Aleena Anto; Tendenthoi Devi Haobijam; Gurbani Kaur	Women's four	6:45.75	3 FA	6:55.32	6

Key

- FA = Qualified for Final A
- FB = Qualified for Final B

== Rugby sevens ==
Team	Event	Group stage				Placement Match 1	Placement Match 2	Rank
Team	Event	Opposition score	Opposition score	Opposition score	Rank	Opposition score	Opposition score	Rank
Women's team	Women's tournament	Hong Kong; L 7–33	China; L 5–43	Malaysia; W 26–5	3	Singapore; W 22–5	Kazakhstan; L 0–20	6

Key

- W = Win
- L = Loss

Women's tournament

Squad

Head Coach: (South Africa) Paul Delport

1. Shikha Yadav (c)
2. Amandeep Kaur
3. Guriya Kumari
4. Ujjwala Ghuge
5. Parbati Hansdah
6. Arti Kumari
7. Dumuni Marandi
8. Kalyani Patil
9. Vaishnavi Patil
10. Sandhya Rai
11. Nirmalya Raut
12. Bhumika Shukla
13. Sandhyarani Tudu

Group stage

Pos	Team	Pld	W	D	L	PF	PA	PD	Pts	Qualification
1	China	3	3	0	0	110	15	+95	9	Semi-finals
2	Hong Kong	3	2	0	1	79	43	+36	7	Semi-finals
3	India	3	1	0	2	38	81	−43	5	5–8th place semi-finals
4	Malaysia	3	0	0	3	17	105	−88	3	5–8th place semi-finals

1 October 2026
12:20

Hong Kong	33–7	India
Try: Chong (2) 3' c, 7+' c Rivers 4' c Au Yeung 13' m Olson 14' c Con: Chan S. (3/3); Ho (1/2)	Report	Try: Tudu 10' c Con: Tudu (1/1)

Paloma Mizuho Rugby Stadium
Referee: Hibiki Ikeda (Japan)

1 October 2026
19:00

China	43–5	India
Try: Chen C. (2) 3' c, 9' m Dou 5' c Chen K. 7' m Wang W. 11' c Zhang 13' m Gao 14' c Con: Chen K. (2/4); Dou (1/1); Zheng (1/2)	Report	Try: Kumari 2' m Con: Hansdah (0/1)

Paloma Mizuho Rugby Stadium
Referee: Christabelle Mee Lim (Singapore)

2 October 2026
12:20

India	26–5	Malaysia
Try: Kumari 1' c Shukla 3' m Patil K. 5' c Tudu 10' c Con: Tudu (1/2); Shukla (2/2)	Report	Try: Jenisin 14+' m Con: Azhar (0/1)

Paloma Mizuho Rugby Stadium
Referee: Christabelle Mee Lim (Singapore)

== Sailing ==
The Yachting Association of India selected ten athletes to represent the nation at the Games.

Individual

Athlete	Event	Qualifying Race												Medals Race		Recalculated Points	Total Points	Net Points	Rank
Athlete	Event	1	2	3	4	5	6	7	8	9	Total Points	Net Points (Note: The lowest score is excluded for calculating the net points)	Rank (Note: Top ten advance to the medals race)	MR1	MR2	Recalculated Points	Total Points	Net Points	Rank
Vishnu Saravanan	Men's ILCA 7	8	9	1	3	6	7	1	6	(19); RET	60	41	7 Q	2	2	17	21		4
Nethra Kumanan	Women's ILCA 6	(5)	3	4	5	2	5	2	3	4	33	28	2 Q	6	1	7	14		3rd place, bronze medalist(s)

Athlete	Event	Race												Total Points	Net Points	Rank
Athlete	Event	1	2	3	4	5	6	7	8	9	10	11	12	Total Points	Net Points	Rank
Mahi Verma	Girls' ILCA 4	(10); RET	4	1	(8)	8	8	6	6	7	5	6	6	75	57	8
Katya Coelho	Women's iQFoil	7	7	7	7	7	7	7	7	(8); DNS	8 DNS	—N/a		72	64	7

Team

Athlete	Event	Race										Total Points	Net Points	Rank
Athlete	Event	1	2	3	4	5	6	7	8	9	10	Total Points	Net Points	Rank
Prince Noble; Manu Francis	Men's 49er	2	3	1	4	2	5	4	(6)	2	—N/a	29	23	2nd place, silver medalist(s)
Harshita Tomar; Shital Verma	Women's 49erFX	(4)	3	2	2	3	3	4	3	4	—N/a	28	24	3rd place, bronze medalist(s)
Ravindra Kumar Sharma; Shraddha Verma	470	(10); DSQ	5	8	4	6	6	6	6	9 RET	5	65	55	7

== Sepak takraw ==
Athlete	Event	Group stage				Semi-final	Final	
Athlete	Event	Opposition Score	Opposition Score	Opposition Score	Rank	Opposition Score	Opposition Score	Rank
Arun Raju; Jasvir Sukhbir Singh; Ashish Chundawat; Shyam Chundawat; Lokhon Singh Elangbam; Bobby Kumar; Ashok Singh Mayengbam; Ram Kumar Sharma; Amarjit Singha; Malemnganba Singh Sorokhaibam; Henary Singh Wahengbam; Akash Yumnam	Men's team regu	Japan; L 1–2	Malaysia; L 0–3	Philippines; W 2–1	3	Did not advance		
Arun Raju; Bobby Kumar; Amarjit Singha; Malemnganba Singh Sorokhaibam; Lokhon Singh Elangbam; Akash Yumnam Ram Kumar Sharma	Men's quadrant	Laos; W 2–0	Vietnam; W 2–0	Myanmar; W 2–1	1 Q	Japan; L 0–2	Did not advance	3rd place, bronze medalist(s)
Maipak Devi Ayekpam; Priya Devi Elangbam; Shilpa Elangbam; Chaoba Devi Oinam; Seyiekhrieno Tepa; Malemnganbi Yumnam	Women's quadrant	Vietnam; L 0–2	Philippines; L 1–2	Thailand; L 0–2	4	Did not advance		
Leirentonbi Devi Elangbam; Prity Langoljam; Menenu Tsukru	Women's doubles	South Korea; L 0–2	Philippines; L 0–2	Japan; L 1–2	4	Did not advance		

Key

- W = Win
- L = Loss
- Q = Qualified for the next round

== Shooting ==
In May 2026, the National Rifle Association of India announced a 12-member squad for the shotgun events at the Games. In June 2026, the squads for the pistol and rifle events were announced, which included 18 shooters. Aakash Bharadwaj replaced Gaurav Mansoori in the squad after the latter failed a doping test.

Men
Individual

Athlete	Event	Qualification		Final	
Athlete	Event	Score	Rank	Score	Rank
Aakash Bhardwaj	10 m air pistol	579	11	Did not advance	
Kamaljeet	10 m air pistol	580	9	Did not advance	
Kedarling Uchaganve	10 m air pistol	568	35	Did not advance	
Anish Bhanwala	25 m rapid fire pistol	576	9 Q	11	7
Himanshu Dhillon	10 m air rifle	630.0	7 Q	252.4	2nd place, silver medalist(s)
Parth Mane	10 m air rifle	628.3	11	Did not advance	
Rudrankksh Patil	10 m air rifle	631.8	3 Q	230.9	3rd place, bronze medalist(s)
Aishwary Pratap Singh Tomar	50 m rifle three positions	589	3 Q	327.6	5
Niraj Kumar	50 m rifle three positions	588	4 Q	299	8
Rudrankksh Patil	50 m rifle three positions	585	9	Did not advance	
Anantjeet Singh Naruka	Skeet	119	5 Q	25	4
Bhavtegh Singh Gill	Skeet	111	29	Did not advance	
Mairaj Ahmed Khan	Skeet	116	12	Did not advance	
Ahvar Rizvi	Trap	107	32	Did not advance	
Kynan Chenai	Trap	115	16	Did not advance	
Shapath Bharadwaj	Trap	117	8 Q	7	8

Team

Athlete	Event	Score	Rank
Aakash Bharadwaj; Kamaljeet; Kedarling Uchaganve	10 m air pistol	1727	4
Himanshu Dhillon; Parth Mane; Rudrankksh Patil	10 m air rifle	1890.1	2nd place, silver medalist(s)
Aishwary Pratap Singh Tomar; Niraj Kumar; Rudrankksh Patil	50 m rifle three positions	1762	2nd place, silver medalist(s)
Anantjeet Singh Naruka; Bhavtegh Singh Gill; Mairaj Ahmed Khan	Skeet	346	3rd place, bronze medalist(s)
Ahvar Rizvi; Kynan Chenai; Shapath Bharadwaj	Trap	339	6

Women
Individual

Athlete	Event	Qualification		Final	
Athlete	Event	Score	Rank	Score	Rank
Esha Singh	10 m air pistol	572	15	Did not advance	
Manu Bhaker	10 m air pistol	579	3 Q	181.1	5
Suruchi Singh	10 m air pistol	568	26	Did not advance	
Esha Singh	25 m pistol	580	8 Q	38 SO	2nd place, silver medalist(s)
Manu Bhaker	25 m pistol	579	11	Did not advance	
Rahi Sarnobat	25 m pistol	568	30	Did not advance	
Elavenil Valarivan	10 m air rifle	633.5	7 Q	252.4	2nd place, silver medalist(s)
Sonam Maskar	10 m air rifle	634.1	3 Q	167.0	6
Vidarsa Vinod	10 m air rifle	630.4	12	Did not advance	
Ashi Chouksey	50 m rifle three positions	585	15	Did not advance	
Tilottama Sen	50 m rifle three positions	590	3 Q	337.3	4
Vidarsa Vinod	50 m rifle three positions	588	6 Q	327.4	5
Maheshwari Chauhan	Skeet	109	12	Did not advance	
Parinaaz Dhaliwal	Skeet	111	9 Q	8	8
Raiza Dhillon	Skeet	111	8 Q	23	4
Aashima Ahlawat	Trap	106	16	Did not advance	
Manisha Keer	Trap	104	23	Did not advance	
Neeru Dhanda	Trap	118	1 Q	28 AsR	1st place, gold medalist(s)

Team

Athlete	Event	Score	Rank
Esha Singh; Manu Bhaker; Suruchi Singh	10 m air pistol	1719	4
Esha Singh; Manu Bhaker; Rahi Sarnobat	25 m pistol	1727	5
Elavenil Valarivan; Sonam Maskar; Vidarsa Vinod	10 m air rifle	1898	2nd place, silver medalist(s)
Ashi Chouksey; Tilottama Sen; Vidarsa Vinod	50 m rifle three positions	1763	2nd place, silver medalist(s)
Maheshwari Chauhan; Parinaaz Dhaliwal; Raiza Dhillon	Skeet	331	3rd place, bronze medalist(s)
Aashima Ahlawat; Manisha Keer; Neeru Dhanda	Trap	328	2nd place, silver medalist(s)

Mixed team

Athlete	Event	Qualification		Final	
Athlete	Event	Score	Rank	Score	Rank
Kamaljeet; Suruchi Singh	10 m air pistol	587 EQAsR	1 Q	484.6 AsR	1st place, gold medalist(s)
Parth Mane; Elavenil Valarivan	10 m air rifle	634.6	2 Q	376.3	4
Anantjeet Singh Naruka; Parinaaz Dhaliwal	Skeet	138	4 Q	44	3rd place, bronze medalist(s)
Kynan Chenai; Neeru Dhanda	Trap	136	4 Q	34 AsR	1st place, gold medalist(s)

Key

- Q = Qualified for the next round

== Soft tennis ==
Athlete	Event	Preliminary Round				Round of 16	Quarter-finals	Semi-finals	Final	
Athlete	Event	Opposition Score	Opposition Score	Opposition Score	Rank	Opposition Score	Opposition Score	Opposition Score	Opposition Score	Rank
Jay Meena	Men's singles	Arain (PAK); W 4–0	—N/a		1 Q	—N/a	Nuguit (PHI); W 4–3	Kurosaka (JPN); L 2–4	Did not advance	3rd place, bronze medalist(s)
Aryan Thakur	Men's singles	Altangrel (MGL); W 4–0	Chen (TPE); L 0–4	—N/a	2	Did not advance				
Aniket Patel; Aryan Thakur; Yogesh Choudhary; Om Yadav; Jay Meena	Men's team	Laos (LAO); W 3–0	Chinese Taipei (TPE); L 0–3	Mongolia (MGL); W 3–0	2 Q	—N/a	Indonesia (INA); L 0–2	Did not advance		5
Aadhya Tiwari	Women's singles	Ziegler (THA); L 1–4	Shallwani (PAK); W 4–0	—N/a	2	Did not advance				
Aniket Patel; Aadhya Tiwari	Mixed doubles	Chao / Khun (CAM); W 5–0	Nyamdorj / Ganabaatar (MGL); W 5–0	Kim / Park (KOR); L 1–5	2 Q	Nuguit / Christy (PHI); L 2–5	Did not advance			9

Key

- W = Win
- L = Loss
- Q = Qualified for the next round

== Sport climbing ==
Speed

Athlete	Event	Qualification		Quarter-finals		Semi-finals		Final		Overall rank
Athlete	Event	Time	Rank	Time	Rank	Time	Rank	Time	Rank	Overall rank
Deepu Mallesh	Men	5.09	11 Q	5.32	3	Did not advance				15
Joga Purty	Women	7.28	9 Q	FA	3	Did not advance				12

== Squash ==
The Squash Rackets Federation of India announced an eight-member squad for the Games in June 2026. Joshna Chinappa qualified for her seventh consecutive Asian Games, the most by any Indian.

Singles

Athlete	Event	Round of 64	Round of 32	Round of 16	Quarterfinals	Semi-finals	Final	Rank
Athlete	Event	Opposition Score	Opposition Score	Opposition Score	Opposition Score	Opposition Score	Opposition Score	Rank
Abhay Singh	Men	Bye	Arkarahirunya (THA); W 3–0	Laksiri (SRI); W 3–0	Tsukue (JPN); W 3–0	Irfan (PAK); W 3–0	Ng (MAS); L 0–3	2nd place, silver medalist(s)
Veer Chotrani	Men	Bye	Wakeel (SRI); W 3–0	Jeeva (MAS); W 3–2	Irfan (PAK); L 1–3	Did not advance		5
Anahat Singh	Women	—N/a	Bye	Au Yeong (SGP); W 3–0	Khanna (IND); W 3–0	Watanabe (JPN); W 3–2	Subramaniam (MAS); L 0–3	2nd place, silver medalist(s)
Tanvi Khanna	Women	—N/a	Kim (KOR); W 3–0	Au Yeong (SGP); W 3–1	Singh (IND); L 0–3	Did not advance		5

Doubles

Athlete	Event	Round of 32	Round of 16	Quarterfinals	Semi-finals	Final	Rank
Athlete	Event	Opposition Score	Opposition Score	Opposition Score	Opposition Score	Opposition Score	Rank
Velavan Senthilkumar; Joshna Chinappa	Mixed	Bye	Chand / Riaz (IND); W 2–0	Pelino / Aribado (PHI); W 2–0	Tang / Lee (HKG); L 1–2	Did not advance	3rd place, bronze medalist(s)
Suraj Chand; Shameena Riaz	Mixed	Bye	Senthilkumar / Chinappa (IND); L 0–2	Did not advance			9

Team

Athlete	Event	Group stage				Quarterfinals	Semi-finals	Final	Rank
Athlete	Event	Opposition Score	Opposition Score	Opposition Score	Rank	Opposition Score	Opposition Score	Opposition Score	Rank
Abhay Singh; Veer Chotrani; Velavan Senthilkumar; Suraj Chand	Men	China (CHN); W 3–0	South Korea (KOR); W 3–0	—N/a	1 Q	Kuwait (KUW); W 2–0	Malaysia (MAL); L 1–2	Did not advance	3rd place, bronze medalist(s)
Anahat Singh; Tanvi Khanna; Joshna Chinappa; Shameena Riaz	Women	China (CHN); W 2–1	Japan (JPN); W 2–1	Iran (IRI); W 3–0	1 Q	Singapore (SGP); W 2–0	Hong Kong (HKG); L 1–2	Did not advance	3rd place, bronze medalist(s)

Key

- W = Win
- L = Loss

== Surfing ==
India secured two surfing quotas each during the 2024 and 2025 Asian Surfing Championships. The Surfing Federation of India announced a four member squad for the Games in June 2026.

Surfer	Event	Round 1		Round 2	Round 3	Quarter-final	Semi-final	Final	Rank
Surfer	Event	Score	Rank	Opposition Result	Opposition Result	Opposition Result	Opposition Result	Opposition Result	Rank
Kishore Kumar Anbarasu	Men's shortboard	9.33	1 Q	—N/a	Ma (CHN); W 9.76–8.80	Espejon (PHI); L 5.37–8.53	Did not advance		5
Sivaraj Babu	Men's shortboard	7.03	2 q	Khadir (IRI); W 8.96–3.60	Alciso (PHI); L 7.83–11.50	Did not advance			9
Kamali Prakash	Women's shortboard	3.74	2 q	Spaccarotella (SIN); W 7.57–4.50	Studer (SIN); L 5.67–11.64	Did not advance			9
Sugar Shanti Gayen	Women's shortboard	3.84	2 q	Chen (TPE); W 7.33–5.40	Nonaka (JPN); L 5.17–14.60	Did not advance			9

Key

- Q = Qualified directly for Round 3
- q = Qualified for the next round
- W = Win
- L = Loss

== Swimming ==
Men

Athlete	Event	Heats		Final	
Athlete	Event	Time	Rank	Time	Rank
Srihari Nataraj	50 m backstroke	25.37	9 Q	25.52	10
Rishabh Das	50 m backstroke	25.41	11	Did not advance	
Rishabh Das	100 m backstroke	54.85	5 Q	54.77	6
Utkarsh Patil	100 m backstroke	56.19	12	Did not advance	
Utkarsh Patil	200 m backstroke	2:02.13	9 Q	2:00.94	7
Rishabh Das	200 m backstroke	2:00.53	4 Q	1:58.77	6
Danush Suresh	50 m breaststroke	28.40	21	Did not advance	
Danush Suresh	100 m breaststroke	1:03.46	22	Did not advance	
Benedicton Beniston	50 m butterfly	23.87	12	Did not advance	
Benedicton Beniston	100 m butterfly	53.08	13	Did not advance	
Sajan Prakash	100 m butterfly	DNS		Did not advance	
Sajan Prakash	200 m butterfly	2:00.94	6 Q	1:58.42	7
Heer Shah	50 m freestyle	23.57	28	Did not advance	
Akash Mani	50 m freestyle	23.43	26	Did not advance	
Akash Mani	100 m freestyle	50.85	23	Did not advance	
Benedicton Beniston	100 m freestyle	50.25	12	Did not advance	
Benedicton Beniston; Akash Mani; Heer Shah; Aneesh Gowda	4 × 100 m freestyle	3:23.51	12	Did not advance	
Vedaant Madhavan	200 m freestyle	1:52.01	19	Did not advance	
Aneesh Gowda	200 m freestyle	1:51.20	17	Did not advance	
Vedaant Madhavan; Dhakshan Shashikumar; Aneesh Gowda; Akash Mani	4 × 200 m freestyle	7:24.32	9	Did not advance	
Dhakshan Shashikumar	400 m freestyle	3:58.73	18	Did not advance	
Aneesh Gowda	400 m freestyle	3:58.08	17	Did not advance	
Aryan Nehra	800 m freestyle	—N/a		8:02.52	11
Aryan Nehra	1500 m freestyle	—N/a		15:34.71	12
Benedicton Beniston; Rishabh Das; Akash Mani; Danush Suresh	4 × 100 m medley	3:40.41	7 Q	3:44.26	8

Key

- Q = Qualified for the next round

== Table tennis ==
The Table Tennis Federation of India announced a ten-member squad for the Games in June 2026.

Singles

Athlete	Event	Round of 64	Round of 32	Round of 16	Quarterfinal	Semi-final	Final	Rank
Athlete	Event	Opposition Score	Opposition Score	Opposition Score	Opposition Score	Opposition Score	Opposition Score	Rank
Manav Thakkar	Men	Bye	Rong (PRK); L 2–4	Did not advance				
Manush Shah	Men	Wong (MAS); W 4–0	Faraji (IRN); W 4–0	Lin (CHN); L 0–4	Did not advance			
Sreeja Akula	Women	Bye	Pyon S-g (PRK); L 1–4	Did not advance				
Yashaswini Ghorpade	Women	Bye	Zaza (SYR); W 4–1	Harimoto (JPN); L 1–4	Did not advance			

Doubles

Athlete	Event	Round of 32	Round of 16	Quarterfinal	Semi-final	Final	Rank
Athlete	Event	Opposition Score	Opposition Score	Opposition Score	Opposition Score	Opposition Score	Rank
Harmeet Desai; Sathiyan Gnanasekaran	Men	Pratama / Negara (INA); W 3–2	Matsushima / Togami (JPN); L 0–3	Did not advance			
Manav Thakkar; Manush Shah	Men	Harimoto / Shinozuka (JPN); L 1–3	Did not advance				
Syndrela Das; Sreeja Akula	Women	Batmunkh / Sanjaa (MGL); W 3–0	Kuai / Wang (CHN); L 0–3	Did not advance			
Diya Chitale; Yashaswini Ghorpade	Women	Iloukhani / Ashtari (IRI); W 3–0	Fan / Chen (CHN); L 0–3	Did not advance			
Manush Shah; Diya Chitale	Mixed	Kulappuwawadu / Swarna (SRI); W 3–0	Ahmed / Nazim (MDV); W 3–0	Wong / Doo (HKG); W 3–1	Wong / Sun (CHN); L 0–3	Did not advance	3rd place, bronze medalist(s)
Harmeet Desai; Yashaswini Ghorpade	Mixed	Ismail / Ali (MDV); W 3–2	Yiu / Ng (HKG); W 3–1	Lin / Kuai (CHN); L 0–3	Did not advance		

Team

Athlete	Event	Preliminary Round				Round of 16	Quarterfinal	Semi-final	Final	Rank
Athlete	Event	Opposition Score	Opposition Score	Opposition Score	Rank	Opposition Score	Opposition Score	Opposition Score	Opposition Score	Rank
Sathiyan Gnanasekaran; Harmeet Desai; Manav Thakkar; Manush Shah; Payas Jain	Men	Indonesia; W 3–0	Iran; L 0–3	Pakistan; W 3–0	2 Q	South Korea; L 0–3	Did not advance			
Diya Chitale; Sreeja Akula; Sutirtha Mukherjee; Syndrela Das; Yashaswini Ghorpade	Women	Indonesia; W 3–0	Singapore; W 3–2	Pakistan; W 3–0	1 Q	Thailand; W 3–2	North Korea; L 0–3	Did not advance		

Key

- W = Win
- L = Loss
- Q = Qualified for the next round

== Taekwondo ==
Three taekwondo players qualified for the Games.

Individual

Athlete	Event	Round of 16	Quarterfinal	Semifinal	Final	Rank
Athlete	Event	Opposition Score	Opposition Score	Opposition Score	Opposition Score	Rank
Kashish Malik	Virtual mixed	Lam (HKG); W 2–0	Bakisheva (KAZ); L 1–2	Did not advance		5
Kashish Malik	Women's 57 kg	Kim (KOR); L 0–2	Did not advance			9
Jyoti Yadav	Women's +67 kg	Chuenchooklin (THA); L 0–2	Did not advance			9

Key

- W = Win
- L = Loss

Poomsae

Athlete	Event	Semifinal		Final		Final rank
Athlete	Event	Score	Rank	Score	Rank	Final rank
Rupa Bayor	Women's individual	7.6100	5	Did not advance		9

== Tennis ==
A 12-member tennis squad for the Games was announced by the All India Tennis Association in June 2026. However, five athletes were later removed from the squad due to the new selection criteria enforced by the sports ministry.

Athlete	Event	Round of 64	Round of 32	Round of 16	Quarter-final	Semi-final	Final	Rank
Athlete	Event	Opposition Score	Opposition Score	Opposition Score	Opposition Score	Opposition Score	Opposition Score	Rank
Sumit Nagal	Men's singles	Bye	Hong (KOR); W 6–4, 6–0	Fomin (UZB); W 6–3, 6–2	Wu (CHN); L 4–6, 4–6	Did not advance		5
Dhakshineswar Suresh	Men's singles	Bye	Trismuwantara (INA); W 7–5, 7–6^{(7–2)}	Tseng (TPE); L 3–6, 4–6	Did not advance			9
Yuki Bhambri; Dhakshineswar Suresh	Men's doubles	—N/a	Bye	Yevseyev / Zhukayev (KAZ); W 6–1, 7–5	Ho / Hsu (TPE); L 6–7^{(5–7)}, 3–6	Did not advance		5
Anirudh Chandrasekar; Sriram Balaji	Men's doubles	—N/a	Bye	Bastola / Khadka (NEP); W 6–2, 6–1	Zhang / Jiang (CHN); L 7–6^{(7–4)}, 6–7^{(7–9)}, [8–10]	Did not advance		5
Ankita Raina; Rutuja Bhosale	Women's doubles	—N/a	Danilina / Putintseva (KAZ); L 7–5, 3–6, [5–10]	Did not advance				17
Yuki Bhambri; Rutuja Bhosale	Mixed doubles	—N/a	Bye	Hsieh / Tseng (TPE); L 3–6, 4–6	Did not advance			9
Sriram Balaji; Ankita Raina	Mixed doubles	—N/a	Thompson / Chong (HKG); L 4–6, 4–6	Did not advance				17

Key

- W = Win
- L = Loss

== Teqball ==
Athlete	Event	Preliminary round					Quarterfinals	Semifinals / Repechage	Final / BM	Rank
Athlete	Event	Opposition Score	Opposition Score	Opposition Score	Opposition Score	Rank	Opposition Score	Opposition Score	Opposition Score	Rank
Quimcy Dsouza	Women's singles	Sakamoto (JPN); W 2–1 (10–12, 12–11, 13–11)	Koemyean (CAM); W 2–0 (12–9, 12–7)	—N/a		1 Q	Bye	Sumaya (INA); L 1–2 (12–7, 9–12, 7–12)	Sakamoto (JPN); L 0–2 (11–12, 11–12)	5
Mohammad Anas; Declan Gonsalves	Men's doubles	Giang / Khoa (VIE); L 0–2 (10–12, 8–12)	J Lee / T Lee (KOR); L 0–2 (4–12, 7–12)	—N/a		3	Did not advance			9
Mohammad Anas; Quimcy Dsouza	Mixed doubles	Agustin / Abulencia (PHI); W 2–0 (12–10, 12–3)	Bun / Yorn (CAM); L 1–2 (8–12, 12–7, 10–12)	Dejaroen / Wongkhamchan (THA); L 0–2 (3–12, 8–12)	Alebraheem / Alfailakawi (KUW); W 2–0 (12–1, 12–6)	3 Q	Nguyen / Trinh (VIE); L 0–2 (7–12, 10–12)	Agustin / Abulencia (PHI); W 2–0 (12–3, 12–6)	Nguyen / Trinh (VIE); L 0–2 (9–12, 6–12)	5

Key

- W = Win
- L = Loss
- Q = Qualified for the next round

== Volleyball ==
The Indian men's volleyball team qualified based on their FIVB rankings.

Men's tournament

Summary

Team	Event	Group stage				Quarterfinal	Classification Match 1	Classification Match 2	Rank
Team	Event	Opposition Result	Opposition Result	Opposition Result	Rank	Opposition Result	Opposition Result	Opposition Result	Rank
Men's team	Men's tournament	Vietnam; W 3–0	Hong Kong; W 3–0	Qatar; W 3–2	1 Q	Pakistan; L 0–3	South Korea; W 3–1	Thailand; L 2–3	6

Key

- W = Win
- L = Loss

Squad

Head coach: (Serbia) Dragan Mihailovic

- Joel Jebaraj
- Hemanth Pulparambil
- Muhammad Nihal Chatham
- Chirag Yadav
- Anand Kottarathil
- Jerome Charles
- Om Lad
- Muthusamy Appavu
- John Eanthungal
- Shikhar Singh
- Ashwal Rai
- Amit Gulia

Pool C

Pos	Team	Pld	W	L	Pts	SW	SL	SR	SPW	SPL	SPR	Qualification
1	India	3	3	0	8	9	2	4.500	275	246	1.118	Quarterfinals
2	Qatar	3	2	1	7	8	4	2.000	297	280	1.061	Quarterfinals
3	Vietnam	3	1	2	3	3	7	0.429	230	238	0.966	Classification 9th–16th
4	Hong Kong	3	0	3	0	2	9	0.222	234	272	0.860	Classification 9th–16th

Source: asiangames2026.org
Rules for classification: Tiebreakers

Date	Time		Score		Set 1	Set 2	Set 3	Set 4	Set 5	Total	Attd	Report
27 Sep	16:00	India	3–0	Vietnam	25–23	25–21	25–20			75–64		Boxscore
28 Sep	10:00	India	3–0	Hong Kong	25–22	25–19	25–21			75–62		Boxscore
29 Sep	16:00	Qatar	2–3	India	28–26	27–25	23–25	20–25	22–24	120–125		Boxscore
28 Sep	10:00	India	0–3	Pakistan	19–25	23–25	18–25			60–75		Boxscore

== Weightlifting ==
A five-member weightlifting squad was announced by the Indian Weightlifting Federation in August 2026. Rishikanta Singh Chanambam was subsequently withdrawn from the squad due to a knee injury.

Women

Athlete	Event	Snatch		Clean & Jerk		Total	Rank
Athlete	Event	Result	Rank	Result	Rank	Total	Rank
Mirabai Chanu	49 kg	87	3	111	2	198	2nd place, silver medalist(s)
Gyaneshwari Yadav	53 kg	87	9	108	8	195	8
Nirupama Devi Seram	61 kg	93	8	124	5	217	7
Harjinder Kaur	69 kg	94	9	110	9	204	9

== Wrestling ==
The Wrestling Federation of India held selection trials for the freestyle and Greco-Roman events on 30 and 31 May 2026 respectively. An 18-member squad for the Games was announced at the conclusion of the trials. Subsequently, Mukul Dahiya, Deepanshu Ahlawat, and Deepak were removed from the squad after failing a doping test, thus dropping the squad strength to 15.

Freestyle
Men

Wrestler	Event	Round of 32	Round of 16	Quarter-final	Semi-final	Repechage	Final / BM	Rank
Wrestler	Event	Opposition Result	Opposition Result	Opposition Result	Opposition Result	Opposition Result	Opposition Result	Rank
Aman Sehrawat	57 kg	Bye	Ogawa (JPN); W 20–9^{VSU1}	Aitanov (KAZ); W 12–1^{VSU1}	Belolyubskii (TJK); W 14–8^{VPO1}	—N/a	Han (PRK); W 11–7^{VPO1}	1st place, gold medalist(s)
Sujeet Kalkal	65 kg	Bye	Zazai (AFG); W 13–3^{VSU1}	Abbas (IRN); W 10–0^{VSU}	Kiyooka (JPN); W 3–3^{VPO1}	—N/a	Kudiev (TJK); W 10–9^{VPO1}	1st place, gold medalist(s)
Sagar Jaglan	74 kg	—N/a	Tulga (MGL); W 8–1^{VPO1}	Emami (IRI); L 0–10^{VSU}	Did not advance	Jamalov (UZB); W 7–3^{VPO1}	Kaipanov (KAZ); L 0–5^{VFA}	5
Deepak Punia	97 kg	—N/a	Zhou (CHN); W 12–2^{VSU1}	Vincent (HKG); W VFO	Poyonov (UZB); L 8–9^{VPO1}	—N/a	Ganbaatar (MGL); W 2–1^{VPO1}	3rd place, bronze medalist(s)
Rajat Ruhal	125 kg	—N/a	Kassimbek (KAZ); L 3–8^{VPO1}	Did not advance				8

Women

Wrestler	Event	Round of 16	Quarter-final	Semi-final	Repechage	Final / BM	Rank
Wrestler	Event	Opposition Result	Opposition Result	Opposition Result	Opposition Result	Opposition Result	Rank
Dipanshi Phogat	50 kg	Susaki (JPN); L 0–11^{VSU}	Did not advance		Samnang (CAM); W 10–0^{VSU}	Bayanova (KAZ); L 4–11^{VFA}	5
Antim Panghal	53 kg	Omirbek (KAZ); W 9–0^{VPO}	Esbosynova (UZB); W 8–0^{VFA}	Zhang (CHN); W 6–1^{VPO1}	—N/a	Kiyooka (JPN); L 1–9^{VPO1}	2nd place, silver medalist(s)
Manisha Bhanwala	57 kg	Kwon (KOR); W 8–0^{VPO}	Fujinami (JPN); L 0–3^{VPO}	Did not advance			7
Mansi Ahlawat	62 kg	Kuznetsova (KAZ); W 6–1^{VPO1}	Jo (KOR); W 5–0^{VSU}	Ozaki (JPN); L 0–6^{VPO}	—N/a	Togtokh (MGL); L 2–5^{VFA}	5
Nisha Dahiya	68 kg	Pak (PRK); L 4–4^{VPO1}	Did not advance		Park (KOR); L 4–5^{VFA}	Did not advance	7
Priya Malik	76 kg	Medet Kyzy (KGZ); L 1–6^{VFA}	Did not advance				8

Greco–Roman

Wrestler	Event	Round of 16	Quarter-final	Semi-final	Repechage	Final / BM	Rank
Wrestler	Event	Opposition Result	Opposition Result	Opposition Result	Opposition Result	Opposition Result	Rank
Sumit Dalal	60 kg	Bye	Abbaspourragani (IRI); L 1–1^{VPO1}	Did not advance			9
Aman Baroniya	77 kg	Tuvshinbaatar (MGL); W 8–6^{VPO1}	Badaghimofrad (QAT); L 0–9^{VSU}	Did not advance			7
Sunil Kumar	87 kg	Bye	Sultonzoda (TJK); W 9–0^{VSU}	Yoshida (JPN); L 0–11^{VSU}	—N/a	Roberts (PHI); W 9–0^{VSU}	3rd place, bronze medalist(s)
Nitesh Siwach	97 kg	Bye	Agamammedov (TKM); W 7–1^{VPO1}	Ganbaatar (MGL); W 9–0^{VSU}	—N/a	Nakazato (JPN); L 0–4^{VPO}	2nd place, silver medalist(s)

Key:

- W – Win
- L – Loss
- VFA – Victory by Fall
- VFO – Victory by Forfeit
- VPO – Victory by Points – without any point scored by opponent
- VPO1 – Victory by Points – with point(s) scored by opponent
- VSU – Victory by technical superiority – without any point scored by the opponent
- VSU1 – Victory by technical superiority – with point(s) scored by the opponent

== Wushu ==
The Wushu Association of India announced a seven-member squad in August 2026.

Sanda

Athlete	Event	Round of 16	Quarter-finals	Semi-finals	Final	Rank
Athlete	Event	Opposition Result	Opposition Result	Opposition Result	Opposition Result	Rank
Aryan Sood	Men's 56 kg	Safi (AFG); W 2–0	Abdurashitov (UZB); L 1–2	Did not advance		5
Vikrant Baliyan	Men's 75 kg	Mousavi (IRI); L 0–2	Did not advance			9
Aparna Dahiya	Women's 52 kg	Sinkaei (IRI); L 0–2	Did not advance			9
Naorem Roshibina Devi	Women's 60 kg	Khatun (BAN); W WPD	Chu (MAC); W WPD	Kusumaningtyas (INA); W 2–0	Zhang (CHN); L 0–2	2nd place, silver medalist(s)

Key

- W = Win
- L = Loss

Taolu

Athlete	Event	Event 1		Event 2		Final	
Athlete	Event	Score	Rank	Score	Rank	Score	Rank
Suraj Singh Mayanglambam	Men's changquan	—N/a				9.683	11
Nyeman Wangsu	Women's changquan	—N/a				9.573	15
Hanjabam Langlentombi Devi	Women's nanquan & nandao	9.403	9	9.436	8	18.839	9

== See also ==
- 2026 in Indian sports
