= Sailing at the 2026 Asian Games – Women's 49erFX =

Women's 49erFX at the 2026 Asian Games
- Venue: Kaiyoh Yacht Harbor
- Date: 28 September – 1 October 2026
- Competitors: 8 from 4 nations

Medalists
| gold medal | Misaki Tanaka; Sera Nagamatsu | Japan |
| silver medal | Emily Polson; Tiffany Mak | Hong Kong |
| bronze medal | Harshita Tomar; Shital Verma | India |

The women's 49erFX competition at the 2026 Asian Games was held from 28 September – 1 October 2026 at Kaiyoh Yacht Harbor in Gamagōri, Aichi, Japan.

Misaki Tanaka and Sera Nagamatsu won the gold medal, Emily Polson and Tiffany Mak took silver and Harshita Tomar and Shital Verma bronze.

== Schedule ==
All times are Japan Standard Time (UTC+09:00).

| Date | Time | Event |
|---|---|---|
| Monday, 28 September 2026 | 11:10 | Race 1–2 |
| Wednesday, 30 September 2026 | 11:05 | Race 3–5 |
| Thursday, 1 October 2026 | 10:05 | Race 6–9 |

== Results ==
Legend

- DSQ — Disqualification
- UFD — U flag disqualification

| Rank | Team | Race | | | | | | | | | Total | Net |
| Rank | Team | 1 | 2 | 3 | 4 | 5 | 6 | 7 | 8 | 9 | Total | Net |
|---|---|---|---|---|---|---|---|---|---|---|---|---|
| 1st place, gold medalist(s) | Japan (JPN); Misaki Tanaka; Sera Nagamatsu | ~~(3)~~ | 2 | 1 | 1 | 2 | 1 | 2 | 1 | 1 | 14 | 11 |
| 2nd place, silver medalist(s) | Hong Kong (HKG); Emily Polson; Tiffany Mak | 1 | 1 | ~~(3)~~ | 3 | 1 | 2 | 3 | 2 | 2 | 18 | 15 |
| 3rd place, bronze medalist(s) | India (IND); Harshita Tomar; Shital Verma | ~~(4)~~ | 3 | 2 | 2 | 3 | 3 | 4 | 3 | 4 | 28 | 24 |
| 4 | China (CHN); Hu Xiaoyu; Sun Yuyue | 2 | ~~(5)~~; UFD | 4 | 4 | 4 | 5 DSQ | 1 | 5 DSQ | 3 | 33 | 28 |
