= Sailing at the 2022 Asian Games – Women's 49erFX =

Women's 49erFX at the 2022 Asian Games
- Venue: Xiangshan Sailing Centre
- Date: 21–26 September 2023
- Competitors: 12 from 6 nations

Medalists
gold medal	Hu Xiaoyu; Shan Mengyuan	China
silver medal	Misaki Tanaka; Sera Nagamatsu	Japan
bronze medal	Kimberly Lim; Cecilia Low	Singapore

The women's 49erFX competition at the 2022 Asian Games was held from 21 to 26 September 2023 at Xiangshan Sailing Centre in Ningbo.

== Schedule ==
All times are China Standard Time (UTC+08:00)

Date	Time	Event
Thursday, 21 September 2023	11:10	Race 1–3
Friday, 22 September 2023	14:00	Race 4–6
Saturday, 23 September 2023	11:10	Race 7–8
Sunday, 24 September 2023	14:00	Race 9–10
Monday, 25 September 2023	11:10	Race 11–12
Tuesday, 26 September 2023	14:00	Race 13–14

== Results ==
Rank	Team	Race														Total
Rank	Team	1	2	3	4	5	6	7	8	9	10	11	12	13	14	Total
1st place, gold medalist(s)	China (CHN); Hu Xiaoyu; Shan Mengyuan	2	1	2	3	1	1	4	2	3	~~(5)~~	3	2	1	2	27
2nd place, silver medalist(s)	Japan (JPN); Misaki Tanaka; Sera Nagamatsu	1	5	5	1	~~(6)~~	4	2	1	2	1	1	1	4	1	29
3rd place, bronze medalist(s)	Singapore (SGP); Kimberly Lim; Cecilia Low	3	3	1	2	~~(4)~~	2	3	3	1	3	4	4	2	3	34
4	India (IND); Harshita Tomar; Shital Verma	~~(6)~~	2	3	4	2	3	1	5	4	2	5	6	6	4	47
5	Hong Kong (HKG); Sandy Choi; Maddalena Di Salvo	4	~~(6)~~	6	5	3	6	6	6	6	4	2	3	3	6	60
6	Thailand (THA); Narisara Satta; Nichapa Waiwai	5	4	4	~~(6)~~	5	5	5	4	5	6	6	5	5	5	64
