= Ram Kumar Sharma (sepak takraw) =

Indian sepak takraw player

Ram Kumar Sharma (born 2003) is an Indian sepak takraw player from Delhi. He is a feeder player and made his Asian Games debut. He was part of the Indian men's regu and quadrant teams at the 2026 Asian Games in Japan. He was part of the Indian quadrant team that won a bronze medal at the 2018 Asian Games.

Sharma is from Delhi. He works for the Income Tax Department in Mumbai.

== Career ==
He was part of the Indian quadrant team that entered the semifinals in the 2026 Asian Games. He won a bronze medal along with Malemnganba Singh Sorokhaibam, Bobby Kumar, Akash Yumnam, Lokhon Singh Elangbam and Arun Raju. The Indian team beat Myanmar 10-15, 15-13, 15-7 and is assured of a bronze medal. Earlier, India defeated Laos People's Democratic Republic 2-0, Vietnam 2-0 and Myanmar 2-1 to enter the semifinals.

In March 2025, he was part of the three-member Indian regu team that won a gold medal at the International Sepaktakraw Federation (ISTAF) World Cup at the Pataliputra Indoor Stadium in Patna, Bihar. After losing the first set 11-15, India defeated Japan 15-11, 17-14, in the next two for a 2-1 win in the event participated by 21 countries.
