= Malemnganba Singh Sorokhaibam =

Indian sepak takraw player (born 1998)

Personal information
- National team: India
- Born: 10 February 1998 (age 28)

Sport
- Country: India
- Sport: Sepak takraw
- Event: Men's Regu
Medal record
Men's Sepak takraw
Representing India
Asian Games
Bronze medal – third place	2026 Aichi-Nagoya	Quadrant
Bronze medal – third place	2018 Jakarta-Palemberg	Quadrant

Malemnganba Singh Sorokhaibam (born 10 February 1998) is an Indian sepak takraw player from Manipur. He is part of the Indian men's regu and quadrant teams at the 2026 Asian Games in Japan. He was part of the Indian quadrant team that won a bronze medal at the 2018 Asian Games.

== Career ==
Sorokhaibam was part of the Indian quadrant team that entered the semifinals in the 2026 Asian Games along with Akash Yumnum, Bobby Kumar, Ram Kumar Sharma, Amarjit Singha, Arun Raju and Lokhon Singh Elangbam. The Indian team beat Myanmar 10-15, 15-13, 15-7 and is assured of a bronze medal. Earlier, India defeated Laos People's Democratic Republic 2-0, Vietnam 2-0 and Myanmar 2-1 to enter the semifinals.
