= Sailing at the 2026 Asian Games =

- Venue: Kaiyoh Yacht Harbor
- Dates: 26 September - 3 October 2026
- Competitors: 146 from 22 nations

Sailing at the 2026 Asian Games is currently holding between 26 September and 3 October 2026 at Kaiyoh Yacht Harbor.

== Medal table ==
* Host nation (Japan)

Rank	Nation	Gold	Silver	Bronze	Total
1	Hong Kong	4	4	2	10
2	Japan*	3	3	1	7
3	China	3	0	1	4
4	South Korea	2	2	2	6
5	Thailand	2	1	2	5
6	Singapore	0	3	1	4
7	India	0	1	2	3
8	Malaysia	0	0	3	3
Totals (8 entries)		14	14	14	42

== Medalists ==
=== Men's ===
Event	Gold	Silver	Bronze
ILCA 7	Ha Jee-min; South Korea	Nicholas Halliday; Hong Kong	Khairulnizam Mohd Afendy; Malaysia
49er	China; Wen Zaiding; Liu Tian	India; Prince Noble; Manu Francis	Hong Kong; Akira Sakai; Russell Aylsworth
iQFoil	Bi Kun; China	Lee Tae-hoon; South Korea	William McMillan; Thailand
29er	Hong Kong; Ethan Kiu; Louis Polson	Singapore; Sean Kum; Nigel Tan	Malaysia; Muhammad Adam Aierell; Iqbal Nazham Musmuliadi
ILCA 4	Choi Ji-un; South Korea	Ian Goh; Singapore	Tiago Cheng De Villemor Salgado; Hong Kong
Boys iQFoil	Wong Tsz Ho; Hong Kong	Masato Kozono; Japan	Wong John Tze Xiang; Singapore

=== Women's ===
Event	Gold	Silver	Bronze
ILCA 6	Sophia Montgomery; Thailand	Jania Ang; Singapore	Nethra Kumanan; India
49erFX	Japan; Misaki Tanaka; Sera Nagamatsu	Hong Kong; Emily Polson; Tiffany Mak	India; Harshita Tomar; Shital Verma
iQFoil	Li Wenqi; China	Ma Kwan Ching; Hong Kong	Rina Niijima; Japan
29er	Hong Kong; Chloe Kong; McCarley Wong	Japan; Natsumi Funazawa; Natsuko Funazawa	Malaysia; Nor Izniey Humaira Mohd Azri; Aina Zulakhia Azizul Rahman
ILCA 4	Pinchanok Klaysomboon; Thailand	Huang Zixi; Hong Kong	Lee Song-ha; South Korea
Girls iQFoil	Cheung Tsz Yuet; Hong Kong	Akari Oshima; Japan	Chanatkan Charoensuk; Thailand

=== Mixed ===
Event	Gold	Silver	Bronze
470	Japan; Tetsuya Isozaki; Yurie Seki	South Korea; Kim Chang-ju; Lee Gyeong-jin	China; Dong Wenju; Xiao Hailun
420	Japan; Misaki Tsunomori; Riho Sanematsu	Thailand; Pitipoom Jaroenpon; Worrakan Saksriklom	South Korea; Choi Gae-un; Kim Tae-rin

== Participating nations ==
- Cambodia (1)
- China (10)
- Chinese Taipei (1)
- Hong Kong (16)
- India (10)
- Iran (1)
- Japan (20)
- Kazakhstan (6)
- Kuwait (1)
- Kyrgyzstan (1)
- Malaysia (12)
- Oman (4)
- Pakistan (3)
- Philippines (8)
- Qatar (1)
- Singapore (11)
- South Korea (13)
- Sri Lanka (2)
- Thailand (16)
- United Arab Emirates (4)
- Uzbekistan (2)
- Vietnam (3)
