= Kirti Sharma =

Indian recurve archer (born 2007)

Kirti Sharma (born 2007) is an Indian recurve archer from Haryana. She qualified to represent India in recurve women's individual and team events, along with Ankita Bhakat and Kumkum Mohod, at the 2026 Asian Games at Nagoya, Aichi Prefecture, Japan from 19 September to 4 October 2026.

== Early life ==
Sharma is from Ritoli village, Jind district, Haryana. She is the fourth daughter of Badri Vishal Sharma. She is studying second BA. In Class 8, she joined the archery sessions which were started by former national level archer Uddham Singh and trained under him at the school. A few months later, watching her interest, her father Sharma took a loan of Rs.60,000 from a moneylender to buy her a fiberglass limbed recurve bow.

== Career ==
Sharma qualified in the four day trials at Sonipat in May 2026 and topped the women's selection trials for Asian Games and World Cup stages 3 and 4. She was ahead of Asian games medallist Simranjit Kaur, four time Olympian Deepika Kumari and subsequently, Olympic semifinalists Ankita Bhakat. Earlier in the January trials, she finished fifth.

In July 2026, she reached the semifinals of the Archery World Cup Stage 4 at Madrid but missed the bronze medal in the mixed recurve event along with Dhiraj Bommadevara. She made her World Cup debut in Antalya in June.

In February 2020, representing Rajasthan University, she won a gold medal in the women's compound archery event and silver medals in the team and mixed events.
