= Tamanna Dhankheri =

Indian athlete (born 2006)

Tamanna Dhankheri (born 15 May 2006) is an Indian athlete from Haryana, who specialises in 100 metre sprint. She qualified to represent India in women's and mixed 4x100 metre events at the 2026 Asian Games at Nagoya, Aichi Prefecture, Japan from 19 September to 4 October 2026.

Dhankheri is from Jind district, Haryana.

== Career ==
Dhankheri was part of the Indian women's 4x100 metre relay, along with Abinaya Rajarajan, Sneha Gowda, Srabani Nanda, Sudeshna Shuvankar, who qualified for the final of the Asian Games in Japan. The Indian quartet timed 43.65 seconds to finish first in Heat 2. In June 2025, she claimed a bronze medal in the 400m run clocking 55.31 seconds at the 23rd National Junior Federation Athletics Championships at Madan Mohan Malviya Sports Stadium in Prayagraj, Uttar Pradesh.

In February 2023, she won a gold medal in the 100m sprint at the Khelo India Youth Games 2022.
