= Raj Rani (kabaddi) =

Indian kabaddi player (born 1998)

Raj Rani (born 28 December 1998) is an Indian kabaddi player from Haryana. She plays for the Indian national team as an allrounder and a right raider. She represented India at the 2026 Asian Games in Japan.

Rani is from Khanpur Kalan village in Sonepat district, Haryana. She represents Haryana team in the domestic tournaments.

== Career ==
Rani was part of the Haryana team that won the gold medal at the 72nd Women's Senior National Kabaddi Championship at Hyderabad, defeating Indian Railways 39–37 in the final.
