= Neeraj Chauhan =

Indian recurve archer (born 2003)

Neeraj Chauhan (born 2003) is an Indian recurve archer. He qualified to represent India in recurve men's individual and team events, at the 2026 Asian Games at Nagoya, Aichi Prefecture, Japan from 19 September to 4 October 2026.

== Early life ==
Chauhan is from Meerut, Uttar Pradesh. His father Akshaylal Chauhan, used to work as a cook at Kailash Prakash Stadium in Meerut. He has two elder brothers. One of his brothers, Sunil Chauhan, is a national level boxer. Both the brothers used to sell vegetables on the street to earn a livelihood after their father lost the job during COVID-19 after about 30 years of service. Following the news, the Sports Ministry sanctioned Rs.5 lakh under the Pandit Deendayal Upadhyay National Welfare Fund for Sportspersons. In 2021, after turning 18, he joined Indo Tibetan Border Police as a constable. He trains under coach Jitendra Chauhan at the SAI National Centre of Excellence in Sonepat, Haryana.

== Career ==
In March 2022, Chauhan qualified for the World Cup, World Games and Asian Games following the selection trials at the Sports Authority of India centre in Sonipat, Haryana. In March 2022, he was also selected by Archer Association of India and SAI to train at World Archery Excellence Center in Lausanne for 15 days. In March, he also won a silver medal at the nationals in Jammu.

In 2022, he took part in Antalya 2022 Hyundai Archery World Cup stage 1, where he finished 65th, Gwangju 2022 Hyundai Archery World Cup stage 2 (33rd) and Paris 2022 Hyundai Archery World Cup stage 3 (65th). In 2023, he came 65th at Antalya World Cup stage 1 and 33rd at Shanghai stage 2.

In December 2024, he bagged 692 points and broke Tarundeep Rai's record of 687 points in the Recurve men's ranking round at the National Archery Championship at Jamshedpur.

In 2025, at the Madrid 2025 Hyundai Archery World Cup stage 4, he came 17th. In June 2026, at the Antalya WC stage 3, he finished 14th and in July at Madrid World Cup stage 4, he came 10th.
