= Nikita Kumari =

Indian kabaddi player (born 2009)

Nikita Kumari (born 15 July 2009) is an Indian kabaddi player from Haryana. She plays a left raider. She represented India at the 2026 Asian Games in Japan. She represented Murthal Magnets team in the JSG Women's Yuva Kabaddi Series 2024.

Kumari is from Hasangarh, Hissar district, Haryana. Her father Anil Nain is a farmer and mother Vinod Kumari is a homemaker. She is the fourth of seven siblings, including a twin sister, and only younger brother, Deepanshu. She was inspired by her cousin Seema, a kabaddi player, and took to the sport at the age of 10.

== Career ==
Kumari attended all the three National coaching camps and was selected for India's Asian Games team in the final coaching camp. In 2023, she was part of the Haryana team that won the gold in the 2023 Sub Junior National Kabaddi Championships at Hisar. In the Yuva Kabaddi Series, she played 7 matches and scored 151 points in 2024.
