= Manisha Kumari =

Indian kabaddi player (born 2003)

Manisha Kumari (born 6 April 2003) is an Indian kabaddi player from Haryana. She represented India at the 2026 Asian Games in September 2026. She plays as a left-corner defender for the Indian women's team.

== Early life ==
Kumari was born on 6 April 2003 in Rohilla village, Bhiwani district, Haryana, India. Her father, Rampal, is a farmer and her mother, Rajpati Devi, is a homemaker. She has five siblings, three elder sisters, and an younger brother and a sister. She did her schooling at the Government Senior Secondary School, Rohilla, where she started playing kabaddi in Class 9 at the age of 14. She did her graduation in arts.

== Career ==
Kumari was among the Indian probables for the final three camps organised by the Amateur Kabaddi Federation of India and Pro Kabaddi League. In September 2026, she was named in the final Indian team as a defender. She played for Murthal Magnets in the JSG Women's Yuva Kabaddi Series 2024.
