= Ashu Malik (kabaddi) =

Indian kabaddi player (born 2002)

Personal information
- Nationality: Indian
- Born: 9 January 2002 (age 24) Sonipat, Haryana, India

Sport
- Sport: Kabaddi
- Position: Raider (right)
- Team: Dabang Delhi K.C. (PKL)
Medal record
Men's kabaddi
Representing India
Asian Games
Gold medal – first place	2026 Aichi–Nagoya	Team

Ashu Malik (born 9 January 2002) is an Indian kabaddi player from Haryana. He plays as a right raider. He represented India at the 2026 Asian Games in September 2026. He plays for Dabang Delhi KC in the Pro Kabaddi League.

== Early life ==
Malik is born on 9 January 2002 in Sonipet, Haryana, India. He started playing kabaddi at the age of 12.

== Career ==
Malik made his debut in the Pro Kabaddi League in 2021 for Delhi Dabang KC which went on to win the title in Season 8. He was also part of the team that won the Season 12 in 2025. He played for Murthal Magnets in the Yuva Kabaddi League in 2022.

In 2026, he attended all the selection camps and was selected for Indian team in the final camp.
