= Sonam Maskar =

Indian sport shooter (born 2002)

Personal information
- Full name: Sonam Uttam Maskar
- Born: 18 September 2002 (age 24) Maharashtra, India

Sport
- Sport: Shooting
- Event: 10 m air rifle
Medal record
Women's 10 m air rifle shooting
Representing India
World Championships
Silver medal – second place	2026 Doha	Team
Asian Games
Silver medal – second place	2026 Aichi–Nagoya	Team
World Cup Final
Silver medal – second place	2024 New Delhi	Individual
World Cup
Silver medal – second place	2024 Cairo	Individual
Silver medal – second place	2024 Cairo	Mixed team
Bronze medal – third place	2024 Hangzhou	Mixed team

Sonam Uttam Maskar (born 18 September 2002) is an Indian sport shooter specialising in 10 meter air rifle events. She represented India at the 2026 Asian Games and won a silver medal in the women's 10 metre air rifle team event.

== Early life ==
Sonam was born on 18 September 2002 in Maharashtra. She played chess during her college days in Mumbai and took up sports shooting in 2018. Her father, Uttam Maskar, sold his family property to buy her a rifle and other sporting equipment.

== Career ==
In October 2024, she won a silver medal in the women's 10m air rifle event at the 2024 ISSF World Cup final in New Delhi. She represented India at the 2026 Asian Games held in September 2026. In the women's 10 meter air rifle team event, she partnered with Elavenil Valarivan and Vidarsa Vinod to win the silver medal with a combined score of 1898 points. This was India's first medal at the 2026 Asian Games for India. She scored an individual total of 634.1, the highest among the three Indians.
