= Sumit Sangwan (kabaddi) =

Indian kabaddi player (born 1999)

Personal information
- Born: 24 March 1999 (age 27)

Sport
- Country: India
- Sport: Kabaddi
- Club: UP Yoddhas
Medal record
Men's kabaddi
Representing India
Asian Games
Gold medal – first place	2026 Aichi–Nagoya	Team

Sumit Sangwan (born 24 March 1999) is an Indian kabaddi player from Haryana. He plays in the Pro Kabaddi League for the UP Yoddhas franchise as a defender. He represented India at the 2026 Asian Games in Japan.

== Early life ==
Sangwan was born on 24 March 1999, in Adampur Dadhi, Bhiwani district, Haryana. He works for Indian Railways. His father Sangwan, a farmer, is a former kabaddi player.

== Career ==
Sangwan joined the kabaddi league in 2019 entering the PKL Season 7 for UP Yoddhas, where he was awarded the Young Player of the Season. For five seasons he played for the same team till 2024. In his sixth season, he captained the UP Yoddhas team for PKL Season 12 in 2025.
