= Vidarsa Vinod =

Indian sport shooter (born 1999)

Personal information
- Full name: Vidarsa Kochalumkal Vinod
- Born: 20 June 1999 (age 27)

Sport
- Sport: Shooting
- Event: 10 m air rifle
Medal record
Women's shooting
Representing India
Asian Games
Silver medal – second place	2026 Aichi–Nagoya	10 metre air rifle team
Silver medal – second place	2026 Aichi–Nagoya	50 m rifle 3 positions team

Vidarsa Vinod (born 20 June 1999) is an Indian sport shooter specialising in 10 meter air rifle. She won a silver medal in the women's 10 meter air rifle team event at the 2026 Asian Games in September 2026.

== Career ==
Vidarsa Vinod was born on 20 June 1999. She hails from Thiruvambadi, Kozhikode, Kerala. She graduated from St Mary's College at Kozhikode, where she first took up shooting as a part of National Cadet Corps in 2018.

She represented India at the 2026 Asian Games held in September 2026. In the women's 10 meter air rifle team event, she partnered with Elavenil Valarivan and Sonam Maskar to win the silver medal with a combined score of 1898 points. This was India's first medal at the 2026 Asian Games for India. She also became the first sportswoman from Kerala to bag an Asian Games medal in shooting.
