= Jaideep Dahiya =

Indian kabaddi player (born 2002)

Personal information
- Full name: Jaideep Kuldeep Dahiya
- Nationality: Indian
- Born: 12 December 2002 (age 23) Haryana, India

Sport
- Sport: Kabaddi
- Position: Left corner defender
- League: Pro Kabaddi League
- Team: Haryana Steelers
Medal record
Men's kabaddi
Representing India
Asian Games
Gold medal – first place	2026 Aichi–Nagoya	Team

Jaideep Kuldeep Dahiya (born 12 December 2002) is an Indian kabaddi player. He plays as a left corner defender. He represented India in the 2026 Asian Games. He is from Sisana village in Sonipat district, Haryana.

== Career ==
Dahiya plays from Haryana Steelers in the Pro Kabaddi League. He captained the team for Season 12 in 2025. In Season 11, the Steelers won their maiden PKL title defeating Patna Pirates 32.23 in 2024.
