= Kumkum Mohod =

Indian archer

Personal information
- Full name: Kumkum Anil Mohod
- Born: 10 March 2009 (age 17) Amravati, Maharashtra, India

Sport
- Country: India
- Sport: Archery
- Event: Recurve

Achievements and titles
- Highest world ranking: 28 (5 October 2026)
- Personal best: 671 (2026)
Medal record
Women's recurve archery
Representing India
Asian Games
Gold medal – first place	2026 Aichi–Nagoya	Individual
Gold medal – first place	2026 Aichi–Nagoya	Team
Silver medal – second place	2026 Aichi–Nagoya	Mixed team
World Cup
Gold medal – first place	2026 Shanghai	Team
Gold medal – first place	2026 Antalya	Mixed team
- Updated on 2 October 2026

Kumkum Anil Mohod (born 10 March 2009) is an Indian female recurve archer. She is a double gold medalist at the Asian Games, winning the recurve women's individual and team events in the 2026 edition.

== Career ==
Mohod made her first-ever appearance at the 2025 Asia Cup in Bangkok.

=== 2026 ===
Mohod performed well in the trials for the 2026 National team selection and made her Archery World Cup debut during the Puebla leg of the 2026 Archery World Cup.

In May, Mohod, along with Ankita Bhakat and Deepika Kumari, stunned South Korea and China to win a gold medal in the women's team event at the Shanghai leg of the World Cup. Later in that month, she qualified to represent the nation at the 2026 Asian Games. She was also selected to participate in the last two stages of the 2026 Archery World Cup.

In June, during the Antalya stage of the World Cup, Mohod, along with Dhiraj Bommadevara, won the gold medal in the recurve mixed team event, defeating South Korea in the final.
