= Pinki Roy =

Indian kabaddi player

Personal information
- Nationality: Indian
- Born: Ranaghat, West Bengal, India

Sport
- Sport: Kabaddi
- Position: Left cover defender
- Team: Indian Railways
Medal record
Women's Kabaddi
Representing India
Asian Games
Gold medal – first place	2026 Aichi–Nagoya	Team

Pinki Roy (born 21 August) is an Indian kabaddi player from West Bengal. She plays as a left cover defender. She was part of the Indian team that won the kabaddi gold medal at the 2026 Asian Games in Japan.

== Early life ==
Roy is from Ranaghat, West Bengal, India. She joined South Central Railway in 2016 and works at Chief Workshop Manager's Office, Mettuguda, Telangana. In 2008, she started playing kabaddi in her school.

== Career ==
Roy was part of the Indian team that won the gold at the 2026 Asian Games. Indian women defeated Iran 37–34 in the final at Nagoya, Japan on 26 September 2026. She was part of the Indian Railways team that won the 64th Senior National Kabaddi Championship in 2016.
