= Sneha Gowda =

Indian sprinter (born 1998)

Personal information
- Full name: Sneha Sathyanarayana Shanuvalli Gowda
- Born: 27 March 1998 (age 28) Shanuvalli, Karantaka, India

Sport
- Sport: Athletics
- Event: Sprints
Medal record
Women's athletics
Representing India
Bronze medal – third place	2026 Aichi–Nagoya	4 × 100 m mixed

Sneha Sathyanarayana Shanuvalli Gowda (born 27 March 1998) is an Indian sprinter who specialises in 100 m events. She won the bronze medal in 4 × 100 m mixed relay at the 2026 Asian Games.

== Early life ==
Sneha is from Shanuvalli village in the Koppa taluk of Chikkamaglauru districtin Karnataka. She works with the Central GST, CBIC at Bengaluru.

== Career ==
Sneha was part of the Indian team that won a silver medal in the women's 4 × 100 m along with Nithya Gandhe, Abhinaya Rajarajan and Srabani Nanda, at the Asian Athletics Championships in Gumi, South Korea. In March 2025, she won a silver medal in the Indian Grand Prix 1 clocking 11.55 seconds. Then she won a gold medal at the Indian Open Athletics Meet with a time of 11.79 seconds. She ended the year with another gold recording 11.62s at the 64th National Open Athletics Championships in Ranchi. In October 2023, she won the gold in the 100 m sprint at the National Games in Goa. In June 2025, she won the 100 m gold at the Karnataka State Athletics Championships.
