= Bhavna Thakur =

Indian kabaddi player (born 1999)

Bhavna Devi Thakur (16 January 1999) is an Indian kabaddi player from Himachal Pradesh. She plays for the Indian women's national kabaddi team and for Himachal Pradesh in domestic tournaments. She is a right cover defender.

== Early life and education ==
Thakur was born in Baila village, Mandi district, Himachal Pradesh. Her father, Prem Singh, is a farmer and mother, Dassi, is a homemaker. She has an elder brother and three sisters. Her first mentors were Netra Singh and Prem Thakur of Mandi District Kabaddi Association. She is studying to complete her master's in history.

== Career ==
Thakur made her debut in 2014. She played the Junior Nationals in the same year. Later, she quit the game but was persuaded to return by Singh and Thakur. She trained at the SAI hostel in Dharamshala. In December 2025, she became the first player from Mandi to win a medal at international level.

In 2023, she was part of the Himachal Pradesh team that won the women's kabaddi gold medal at the National Games held at Goa. In 2024, she represented Himalayan Tahrs in the JSG Women's Yuva Kabaddi Series. In March 2025, she was part of the Indian team that won the 6th Senior Asian Women's Kabaddi Championship at Iran.

She was a part of the Indin women's national kabaddi team that won gold at the 2025 Women's Kabaddi World Cup held in Bangladesh in November 2025.

Led by the local kabaddi association and other sports bodies, she received a warm welcome after returning to Mandi from the World Cup victory in Dhaka, Bangladesh.
