= Devank Dalal =

Indian kabaddi player (born 2000)

Personal information
- Citizenship: India
- Born: 1 April 2000 (age 26) Singhpura Khurd village, Rohtak, Haryana

Sport
- Country: India
- Sport: Kabaddi
- Club: Bengal Warriorz,2025-Present
Medal record
Men's kabaddi
Representing India
Asian Games
Gold medal – first place	2026 Aichi–Nagoya	Team

Devank Dalal (born 1 April 2000) is an Indian kabaddi player from Haryana. He plays as a raider. He was part of the Indian team that won the kabaddi gold at the 2026 Asian Games in September 2026. He captained the Bengal Warriorz team in the Pro Kabaddi League Season 12 in 2025.

Dalal was born in Singhpura Khurd village, Rohtak, Haryana. He works with the Indian Army.

== Career ==
Dalal made his debut in the Pro Kabaddi League in 2022 Jaipur Pink Panthers in Season 9. In 2024 with Patna Pirates, he scored 301 raid points in 25 matches to finish as the best rider in Season 11. He played for Bengal Warriorz in Season 12 as their captain and collected 271 raid points in 16 matches.

He was part of the Services team which won the Nationals at the 71st Senior National Men’s Kabaddi Championship and he was declared as the Best Player.
