= Gaurav Khatri (kabaddi) =

Indian kabaddi player (born 2000)

Gaurav Khatri (born 2 February 2000) is an Indian kabaddi player from Delhi. He plays as a right corner defender. He was part of the Indian team that won the kabaddi gold at the 2026 Asian Games in September 2026. He plays for Puneri Paltans in the Pro Kabaddi League.

== Career ==
Khatri made his Pro Kabaddi League debut in Season 9 in 2022 for Puneri Paltans. Next year, he was part of the Paltans team that won the PKL title. He played for four seasons with Paltans till 2025.
