= Rahul Sethpal =

Indian kabaddi player (born 2001)

Personal information
- Nationality: Indian
- Born: 20 September 2001 (age 25) Haryana, India

Sport
- Country: India
- Sport: Kabaddi
Medal record
Men's kabaddi
Representing India
Asian Games
Gold medal – first place	2026 Aichi–Nagoya	Team

Rahul Sethpal (20 September 2001) is an Indian kabaddi player from Haryana. He plays as a right corner defender. He represented India in the 2026 Asian Games.

Sethpal is from Bapoli village, Panipat district, Haryana.

== Career ==
Sethpal made his Pro Kabaddi League debut in Season 8 with U Mumba in 2021. Later, he moved to Haryna Steelers and was part of the Steelers' team that won the title in Season 11 in 2024. He became the vice captain of the Haryana Steelers in 2025 for Season 12.
