= Ankit Jaglan =

Indian kabaddi player

Ayan Lohchab
Personal information
- Nationality: Indian
- Citizenship: Indian

Sport
- Country: India
- Sport: Kabaddi
- League: Pro Kabaddi League
- Team: Patna Pirates (2023-Present)
Medal record
Men's kabaddi
Representing India
Asian Games
Gold medal – first place	2026 Aichi–Nagoya	Team

Ankit Jaglan is an Indian professional kabaddi player. He was part of the Indian team that won the gold medal at the 2026 Asian Games. He plays in the Pro Kabaddi League (PKL) for the Patna Pirates franchise as an All Rounder.

Jaglan is from Naultha village in Panipat district, Haryana.
