= C. A. Kuttappa =

Indian boxing coach

Chenanda Achaiah Kuttappa (born March 1979) is an Indian boxing coach from Karnataka. He is the chief coach of the Indian men's boxing team. He received the Dronacharya Award in 2018 for boxing.

== Early life ==
Kuttappa is from Kokeri village, near Napoklu, Madikeri taluk, Kodagu district, Karnataka. He joined the Indian Army as a boxer in 1996. As of 2026, he retired from the Madras Engineering Group. and settled in Gokulam, Mysuru. He did his coaching diploma at the National Institute of Sports (NIS) in 2006 and was posted at the Army Institute of Sports. In 2007, he worked as an assistant to the national coach Gurbax Singh Sandhu to train the National team at Patiala. He married PU Ashwini and they have a daughter, CK Yudhi. One of his uncles, C.C. Machaiah, was an Arjuna Awardee in boxing.

== Career ==
Kuttappa became the chief coach of the Indian men's team in 2018 and served for a second term from 2023, including for Paris Olympics in 2024. Earlier, he was among he support staff at the Beijing Olympics when Vijender won a bronze. He was reappointed in January 2026, replacing SAI Rohtak coach Dharmender Yadav, to prepare for the Commonwealth Games and 2026 Asian Games. His trainees include Vijender Singh, an Olympic medallist, Amit Panghal, Suranjoy Singh and Shiv Thapa, the first Indian to win three consecutive Asian Championship medals and the youngest Indian to qualify for Olympics.

As a boxer, he took to the sport in 1992 after dabbling with swimming and volleyball. He won a gold in the Junior Nationals in 1997. He won a bronze in the 1997 National Games. He won a National Games gold medal in 2002. Later, he was injured and did his coaching diploma to stay in touch with the sport.
