= Amarjit Singha =

Indian sepak takraw player

Personal information
- National team: India
- Born: Cachar district, Assam, India

Sport
- Country: India
- Sport: Sepak takraw
- Event: Men's Quadrant
Medal record
Men's Sepak takraw
Representing India
Asian Games
Bronze medal – third place	2026 Hangzhou	Quadrant

O. Amarjit Singha is an Indian sepak takraw player from Assam. He is part of the Indian men's regu and quadrant teams. The quadrant team entered the semifinals in the 2026 Asian Games along with Akash Yumnum, Malemnganba Singh Sorokhaibam, Ram Kumar Sharma and Lokhon Singh Elangbam. The Indian team beat Myanmar 10-15, 15-13, 15-7 and is assured of a bronze medal. Earlier, India defeated Laos and Vietnam in their first two matches.

Singha is from Nayagram village, Cachar district, Assam.
