= Shital Verma =

Indian sailor

Personal information
- Nationality: Indian
- Born: 26 February 2007 (age 19)

Sport
- Country: India
- Sport: Sailing
- Event: 49erFX
- Partner: Harshita Tomar

Shital Verma (born 26 February 2007) is an Indian sailor. She won a bronze medal in the Women's Skiff 49erFX along with Harshita Tomar at the 2026 Asian Games in Japan.

== Career ==
Verma, who plays as a crew, with Tomar at the helm, finished the women's skiff series with 24 net points and were placed fourth at the Kaiyoh Yacht Harbor in Aichi, Japan. But the Chinese pair who finished third were disqualified and the Indian duo secured the bronze medal. In the nine races, Verma and Tomar, accumulated 28 point and discarded one of their fourth-place finishes.

This is the second Asian Games for the duo, who finished fourth after claiming 47 net points from 14 races at the 2022 Asian Games at Hangzhou in 2023. It includes first place in seventh race with one race poinit.
