= Lokhon Singh Elangbam =

Indian sepak takraw player

Personal information
- National team: India
- Born: 4 February 2003 (age 23) Kakching,Manipur,India

Sport
- Country: India
- Sport: Sepak takraw
- Events: Men's Regu and Quadrant
Medal record
Men's Sepak takraw
Representing India
Asian Games
Bronze medal – third place	2026 Hangzhou	Quadrant

Lokhon Singh Elangbam (born 4 February 2003) is an Indian sepak takraw player from Manipur. He is part of the Indian men's regu and quadrant teams.

== Career ==
Kumar was part of the Indian quadrant team that entered the semifinals in the 2026 Asian Games along with Akash Yumnum, Malemnganba Singh Sorokhaibam, Ram Kumar Sharma and Lokhon Singh Elangbam. The Indian team beat Myanmar 10–15, 15–13, 15–7 and is assured of a bronze medal. Earlier, India defeated Laos and Vietnam in their first two matches.
