= Sera Nagamatsu =

Japanese sailor

Personal information
- Nationality: Japanese
- Born: 3 June 1994 (age 32) Japan

Sailing career
- Sport: Sailing
Medal record
Representing Japan
Asian Games
Gold medal – first place	2026 Aichi-Nagoya	Women's 49erFX
Silver medal – second place	2022 Hangzhou	Women's 49erFX

Sera Nagamatsu (Japanese: 永松 瀬羅, born 3 June 1994) is a Japanese sailor who competes in the 49er FX class. She represented Japan at the 2024 Summer Olympics in Paris and won gold in the women's 49erFX event at the 2026 Asian Games alongside Misaki Tanaka.

== Career ==
Nagamatsu studied at Waseda University and is affiliated with Toyota Industries. She competed in the women's 49erFX event at the 2020 Summer Olympics?

At the 2022 Asian Games, held in Hangzhou in 2023, Nagamatsu and her teammate won the silver medal in the women's 49erFX event. She later represented Japan at the 2024 Summer Olympics in Paris, where she and Misaki Tanaka finished 17th in the women's skiff event.

At the 2026 Asian Games in Aichi-Nagoya, Nagamatsu partnered with Tanaka in the women's 49erFX event. The pair moved into first place on the final day and won gold, marking Japan's first Asian Games gold medal in the event.
