= Misaki Tanaka =

Japanese sailor

Personal information
- Nationality: Japanese
- Born: 23 November 1997 (age 28) Osaka Prefecture, Japan

Sailing career
- Sport: Sailing
- Club: Toyota Industries
- Class: 49er FX
Medal record
Representing Japan
Asian Games
Silver medal – second place	2022 Hangzhou	Women's 49erFX
Gold medal – first place	2026 Aichi-Nagoya	Women's 49erFX

Misaki Tanaka (Japanese: 田中 美紗樹, born 23 November 1997) is a Japanese sailor who competes in the women's 49er FX class. She represented Japan at the 2024 Summer Olympics in Paris and won gold in the women's 49erFX event at the 2026 Asian Games with teammate Sera Nagamatsu.

== Career ==
Tanaka attended Waseda University and is affiliated with Toyota Industries. She initially competed in the 470 class before switching to the 49erFX class to pursue qualification for the Paris Olympics. In the 49erFX, she serves as the skipper, responsible for steering and race strategy, while her teammate Sera Nagamatsu serves as crew.

At the 2022 Asian Games, held in Hangzhou in 2023, Tanaka and Nagamatsu won the silver medal in the women's 49erFX event. The pair subsequently represented Japan at the 2024 Summer Olympics in Paris, finishing 17th in the women's skiff event.

At the 2026 Asian Games in Aichi-Nagoya, Tanaka and Nagamatsu won the gold medal in the women's 49erFX event. They moved into the overall lead on the final day of racing and secured the title ahead of Hong Kong, earning Japan's first Asian Games gold medal in the class.
