= Bobby Kumar =

Indian speak takraw player

Bobby Kumar (born 8 September 2005) is an Indian sepak takraw player from Bihar. He is part of the Indian men's regu and quadrant teams.

== Early life ==
Kumar is from Patna, Bihar. He took to the sport after encountering a few players in action at a park in his home town Patna in 2015. In 2019, he took up the sport seriously and joined the Sports Authority of India (SAI) centre in Bareilly, Uttar Pradesh. He is employed as a sub inspector with the Bihar Police.

== Career ==
Kumar was part of the Indian quadrant team that entered the semifinals in the 2026 Asian Games along with Akash Yumnum, Malemnganba Singh Sorokhaibam, Ram Kumar Sharma and Lokhon Singh Elangbam. The Indian team beat Myanmar 10-15, 15-13, 15-7 and is assured of a bronze medal. Earlier, India defeated Laos and Vietnam in their first two matches.
