= Akash Yumnam =

Indian sepak takraw player

Akash Singh Yumnam (born 1996) is an Indian sepak takraw player from Manipur. He is part of the Indian men's regu and quadrant teams at the 2026 Asian Games in Japan, his fourth Asian Games. He was part of the Indian team that won a bronze medal at the 2018 Asian Games.

== Early life ==
Yumnam is from Laipham Khunou village, Imphal district, Manipur. In 2013, his father, a school teacher died and Yumnam had to work as a daily-wage labourer earning Rs.300 a day, to support the family. After struggling for a couple of years, he secured a job with the Sashastra Seema Bal, a border-guarding organisation of the India government.

== Career ==
He was part of the Indian quadrant team that entered the semifinals in the 2026 Asian Games along with Malemnganba Singh Sorokhaibam, Bobby Kumar, Ram Kumar Sharma, Lokhon Singh Elangbam and Arun Raju. The Indian team beat Myanmar 10-15, 15-13, 15-7 and is assured of a bronze medal. Earlier, India defeated Laos People's Democratic Republic 2-0, Vietnam 2-0 and Myanmar 2-1 to enter the semifinals.

In March 2025, he was part of the three-member Indian regu team that won a gold medal at the International Sepaktakraw Federation (ISTAF) World Cup at the Pataliputra Indoor Stadium in Patna, Bihar. After losing the first set 11-15, India defeated Japan 15-11, 17-14, in the next two for a 2-1 win in the event participated by 21 countries.
