= Arun Raju =

Indian speak takraw player

Personal information
- National team: India
- Born: 1 August 2003 (age 23)

Sport
- Country: India
- Sport: Sepak takraw
- Event: Men's Quadrant
Medal record
Men's Sepak takraw
Representing India
Asian Games
Bronze medal – third place	2026 Hangzhou	Quadrant

Arun Raju (born 1 August 2003) is an Indian sepak takraw player. He is part of the Indian men's quadrant team which entered the semifinals in the 2026 Asian Games along with Bobby Kumar, Amarjit Singha, Malemnganba Singh Sorokhaibam, Lokhon Singh Elangbam and Akash Yumnum. The Indian team is assured of a bronze medal.
