= Harshita Tomar =

Indian sailor

Personal information
- Nationality: India
- Born: 2 March 2002 (age 24) Hoshangabad, Madhya Pradesh
- Height: 163 cm (5 ft 4 in)
- Weight: 56 kg (123 lb)

Sailing career
- Sport: Sailing
Medal record
Women's sailing
Representing India
Asian Games
Bronze medal – third place	2018 Jakarta	Open Laser 4.7

Harshita Tomar (born 2 March 2002) is an Indian sailor. She won the bronze medal at 2018 Asian Games in women's Open Laser 4.7. She received a prize money of Rs. 50 lakhs from Madhya Pradesh government.
