= Japan at the 2026 Asian Games =

- IOC code: JPN
- NOC: Japanese Olympic Committee
- Website: www.joc.or.jp (in English)

in Aichi Prefecture and Nagoya, Japan 19 September – 4 October 2026
- Competitors: 932 in 52 sports
- Flag bearers: Akari Fujinami; Rim Nakamura
- Medals Ranked 2nd: Gold 83 Silver 95 Bronze 91 Total 269

Asian Games appearances (overview)
- 1951; 1954; 1958; 1962; 1966; 1970; 1974; 1978; 1982; 1986; 1990; 1994; 1998; 2002; 2006; 2010; 2014; 2018; 2022; 2026

Japan hosted the 2026 Asian Games in the Aichi Prefecture and Nagoya from 19 September to 4 October 2026.

Japan is expected to field more than 900 athletes which is larger than the delegation in the 2022 Asian Games which had 772 athletes.

== Medalists ==
The following Japan competitors won medals at the Games.

Medal	Name	Sport	Event	Date
Gold	Takumi Hojo	Triathlon	Men's triathlon	20 September
Gold	Maho Ono	Karate	Women's individual kata	20 September
Gold	Hinata Taichi	Shooting	Women's 10 m air rifle	20 September
Gold	Kiho Miyamae; Rio Maeda; Sakura Nakatani; Ayaka Iwakura; Rena Temma	Soft tennis	Women's team	20 September
Gold	Tomoyuki Matsushita	Swimming	Men's 200 m individual medley	20 September
Gold	Takuya Kurosaka; Kaito Maruyama; Takafumi Uchimoto; Toshiki Uematsu; Sora Hirooka	Soft tennis	Men's team	20 September
Gold	Kakeru Nishiyama	Karate	Men's individual kata	21 September
Gold	Shin Ohashi	Swimming	Men's 100 m breaststroke	21 September
Gold	Aiko Sugihara	Gymnastics	Women's individual all-around	22 September
Gold	Kazuki Iimura	Fencing	Men's individual foil	22 September
Gold	Yumeki Kojima	Swimming	Men's 400 m individual medley	22 September
Gold	Yuka Ueno	Fencing	Women's individual foil	23 September
Gold	Rena Temma	Soft tennis	Women's singles	23 September
Gold	Shoon Mitsunaga	Swimming	Men's 100 m butterfly	23 September
Gold	Toshiki Uematsu	Soft tennis	Men's singles	23 September
Gold	Kotomi Kato	Swimming	Women's 200 m breaststroke	24 September
Gold	Shin Ohashi	Swimming	Men's 200 m breaststroke	24 September
Gold	Koki Kano	Fencing	Men's individual épée	24 September
Gold	Misaki Emura	Fencing	Women's individual sabre	24 September
Gold	Tomokazu Harimoto; Shunsuke Togami; Sora Matsushima; Yukiya Uda; Hiroto Shinozuka	Table tennis	Men's team	24 September
Gold	Mizuho Hasegawa	Skateboarding	Women's park	25 September
Gold	Izuru Nagahara	Skateboarding	Men's park	25 September
Gold	Kodai Nishiono	Swimming	Men's 200 m backstroke	25 September
Gold	Aiko Sugihara	Gymnastics	Women's floor	25 September
Gold	Shunsuke Baba; Kyosuke Matsuyama; Kazuki Iimura; Toshiya Saito	Fencing	Men's team foil	25 September
Gold	Yuki Hirashita; Sakura Horiuchi; Fatoumanana Nishi; Haruka Yamamoto	3x3 Basketball	Women's tournament	25 September
Gold	Misaki Morota	Athletics	Women's pole vault	25 September
Gold	Yuri Tanaka	Athletics	Women's heptathlon	25 September
Gold	Ichitaka Yamashita	Athletics	Men's marathon	26 September
Gold	Yuki Kurihara	Esports	Puyo Puyo Champions	26 September
Gold	Sera Azuma; Yuka Ueno; Sumire Tsuji; Komaki Kikuchi	Fencing	Women's team foil	26 September
Gold	Hayato Katsuki	Athletics	Men's marathon walk	27 September
Gold	Rim Nakamura	Cycling	Men's BMX freestyle	27 September
Gold	Hiroki Sato; Shouki Takada; Mashika Shirakawa; Koto Toba; Renta Higashi; Yudai Koseko	Esports	Pokémon Unite	27 September
Gold	Hikaru Mori	Gymnastics	Women's trampoline	27 September
Gold	Mako Fukube	Athletics	Women's 100 metres hurdles	27 September
Gold	Yuma Maruyama	Athletics	Men's decathlon	27 September
Gold	Asuma Nakai	Cycling	Men's BMX racing	28 September
Gold	Sae Hatakeyama	Cycling	Women's BMX racing	28 September
Gold	Ryuji Miura	Athletics	Men's 3000 metres steeplechase	28 September
Gold	Kazuto Iizawa	Athletics	Men's 1500 metres	28 September
Gold	Mirai Ikeda	Surfing	Women's shortboard	29 September
Gold	Ko Ochiai	Athletics	Men's 800 m	29 September
Gold	Kanoa Igarashi	Surfing	Men's shortboard	29 September
Gold	Yuki Joseph Nakajima; Fuga Sato; Kenki Imaizumi; Shinya Hayashi	Athletics	Men's 4 × 400 m relay	29 September
Gold	Mitsuki Kondo	Judo	Women's 48 kg	30 September
Gold	Hayato Kondo	Judo	Men's 60 kg	30 September
Gold	Sorato Anraku	Sport climbing	Men's boulder	30 September
Gold	Taizo Yoshida	Wrestling	Men's Greco-Roman 87 kg	30 September
Gold	Ami Ishii	Wrestling	Women's freestyle 68 kg	30 September
Gold	Misaki Tanaka; Sera Nagamatsu	Sailing	Women's skiff	1 October
Gold	Kurumi Ito	Canoeing	Women's kayak single	1 October
Gold	Kanta Umezawa	Cycling	Men's omnium	1 October
Gold	Kaiya Ota	Cycling	Men's sprint	1 October
Gold	Maho Kakita; Tsuyaka Uchino	Cycling	Women's madison	1 October
Gold	Sotaro Fujiwara	Judo	Men's 81 kg	1 October
Gold	Narumi Tanioka	Judo	Women's 63 kg	1 October
Gold	Rin Maeda	Judo	Women's 70 kg	1 October
Gold	Yuri Nakazato	Wrestling	Men's Greco-Roman 97 kg	1 October
Gold	Nonoka Ozaki	Wrestling	Women's 62 kg	1 October
Gold	Rui Yamaguchi	Boxing	Men's 55 kg	2 October
Gold	Yuuki Tanaka	Canoeing	Men's kayak cross	2 October
Gold	Tetsuya Isozaki; Yurie Seki	Sailing	Mixed dinghy	2 October
Gold	Kazushige Kuboki; Naoki Kojima	Cycling	Men's madison	2 October
Gold	Yumi Kajihara	Cycling	Women's omnium	2 October
Gold	Shu Ohba; Sakurako Ohashi; Funa Yanase; Megu Hamada; Mami Ueno; Yui Narumiya; Chiina Kamiya; Ai Kuwahara; Yuzuho Shiokoshi; Juri Ito; Yoshino Nakashima	Football	Women's tournament	2 October
Gold	Ryotaro Masuchi	Judo	Men's 100 kg	2 October
Gold	Riku Okada	Judo	Men's 90 kg	2 October
Gold	Mizuki Sugimura	Judo	Women's 78 kg	2 October
Gold	Yusuke Kusuhara; Shunsuke Nakagawa	Tennis	Men's doubles	2 October
Gold	Yui Susaki	Wrestling	Women's 50 kg	2 October
Gold	Yuka Kagami	Wrestling	Women's 76 kg	2 October
Gold	Shigeyuki Nakarai	Breaking	B-Boys	3 October
Gold	Hidetoshi Tokumochi; Mio Shirakane; Moa Ono; Narumi Tanioka; Miki Mukunoki; Mizuki Sugimura; Yuta Nakamura; Tatsuki Ishihara; Shinsei Hattori; Utana Terada; Hyōga Ōta; Riku Okada	Judo	Mixed team	3 October
Gold	Saki Tsukamoto; Kae Tokumoto	Padel	Women's pairs	3 October
Gold	Chiaki Saegusa; Honoka Tsutsumi; Marin Kajiki; Yume Hirano; Hanako Utsumi; Hana Nagata; Mei Ohtani; Mayu Yoshino; Natsuki Ouchida; Wakana Akita; Michiyo Suda; Sakurako Yazaki; Himawari Matsuda	Rugby sevens	Women's tournament	3 October
Gold	Misaki Tsunomori; Riho Sanematsu	Sailing	Youth mixed dinghy	3 October
Gold	Mio Sakamoto; Sakura Miwa; Kanna Kudo; Shiho Suto; Kyoko Ishikawa; Ayane Nakagawa; Minori Naito; Eri Shimoyama; Mayu Okawa; Yukiko Ueno; Risa Kawamura; Yui Nakamizo; Urara Fujimoto; Yume Kiriishi; Hotaru Tsukamoto; Miu Goto; Saori Yamauchi	Softball	Women's tournament	3 October
Gold	Yuki Sato; Wataru Narawa; Ryota Haruhara; Seiya Takano; Yota Ichikawa; Toshitaka Naito	Sepak takraw	Men's quadrant	3 October
Gold	Neo Suzuki	Sport climbing	Men's lead	3 October
Gold	Ena Shibahara; Jay Friend	Tennis	Mixed doubles	3 October
Gold	Towa Nishimura; Seiya Adachi; Taiyo Watanabe; Daichi Ogihara; Enishi Ura; Yuki Moriya; Kiyomu Date; Mitsuru Takata; Ikkei Nitta; Yusuke Inaba; Toi Suzuki; Kenta Araki; Ren Sasano; Jun Lowrey; Kai Inoue	Water polo	Men's tournament	3 October
Gold	Moe Kiyooka	Wrestling	Women's 53 kg	3 October
Silver	Shiho Saito	Wushu	Women's taijiquan & taijijian	20 September
Silver	Shunsuke Imamura	Cycling	Men's individual time trial	20 September
Silver	Yuina Sakamoto; Akinori Wase	Teqball	Mixed doubles	20 September
Silver	Satomi Suzuki	Swimming	Women's 50 m breaststroke	20 September
Silver	Hidekazu Takehara	Swimming	Men's 100 m backstroke	20 September
Silver	Yumeki Kojima	Swimming	Men's 200 m individual medley	20 September
Silver	Kotetsu Kurokawa; John Harper Jr. Ren Kanechika; Toyoshige Kano; Ibu Yamazaki; Yuto Kawashima; Kazuma Tsuya; Atsuya Ogawa; Avi Schafer; Jaheru Yamauchi; Alex Kirk; Shinji Takashima	Basketball	Men's tournament	20 September
Silver	Mako Hiraizumi; Manami Hayashi; Kazushi Jozuka; Takumi Hojo	Triathlon	Mixed relay	21 September
Silver	Toshiki Uematsu; Rena Temma	Soft tennis	Mixed doubles	21 September
Silver	Shinnosuke Oka	Gymnastics	Men's individual all-around	21 September
Silver	Yugo Kozaki	Karate	Men's 67 kg	21 September
Silver	Tatsuya Murasa; Katsuhiro Matsumoto; Kazusa Kuroda; Tomoyuki Matsushita; Konosuke Yanagimoto; Kazushi Imafuku	Swimming	Men's 4 × 200 m freestyle relay	21 September
Silver	Kaito Tabuchi	Swimming	Men's 1500 m freestyle	22 September
Silver	Tomoyuki Matsushita	Swimming	Men's 400 m individual medley	22 September
Silver	Hidekazu Takehara; Shin Ohashi; Shoon Mitsunaga; Tatsuya Murasa; Shuya Matsumoto	Swimming	Men's 4 × 100 m medley relay	22 September
Silver	Yukiko Wada; Yoshino Sato; Nanami Seki; Nichika Yamada; Maki Yamaguchi; Hitomi Shiode; Hinata Shigihara; Mana Nishizaki; Ai Hirota; Ayane Kitamado; Miina Inoue; Miku Akimoto	Volleyball	Women's tournament	22 September
Silver	Toshikazu Yamanishi	Athletics	Men's half marathon race walk	23 September
Silver	Nanoha Kida	Wushu	Women's jianshu & qiangshu	23 September
Silver	Tomoharu Tsunogai; Shoma Tsukiyama; Kiichi Kaneta; Shinnosuke Oka; Daiki Hashimoto	Gymnastics	Men's team all-around	23 September
Silver	Toshiyuki Tanaka; Ryo Murata; Kazuma Tomoto; Yoshiaki Oiwa	Equestrian	Team eventing	23 September
Silver	Takuya Kurosaka	Soft tennis	Men's singles	23 September
Silver	Misa Nishiyama; Haruka Nakamura; Rina Kishi; Mana Okamura; Aiko Sugihara	Gymnastics	Women's team all-around	23 September
Silver	Rio Shirai	Swimming	Women's 100 m backstroke	23 September
Silver	Satomi Suzuki	Swimming	Women's 100 m breaststroke	23 September
Silver	Shin Ohashi; Hidekazu Takehara; Shiho Matsumoto; Rikako Ikee; Chiho Mizuguchi; Nagisa Ikemoto	Swimming	Mixed 4 × 100 m medley relay	23 September
Silver	Yuki Fukushima; Riko Gunji; Sayaka Hobara; Mayu Matsumoto; Tomoka Miyazaki; Kie Nakanishi; Nozomi Okuhara; Maya Taguchi; Rin Uesaka; Akane Yamaguchi	Badminton	Women's team	24 September
Silver	Shoon Mitsunaga	Swimming	Men's 50 m butterfly	24 September
Silver	Kaito Tabuchi	Swimming	Men's 800 m freestyle	24 September
Silver	Rio Suzuki; Waka Kobori; Ruka Takezawa; Yui Fukuoka; Miyu Namba	Swimming	Women's 4 × 200 m freestyle relay	24 September
Silver	Kiichi Kaneta	Gymnastics	Men's rings	24 September
Silver	Misa Nishiyama	Gymnastics	Women's uneven bars	24 September
Silver	Haruka Inaba; Akari Inaba; Kako Kawaguchi; Ai Sunabe; Riko Otsubo; Momo Inoue; Manami Noda; Yumi Arima; Eruna Ura; Hikaru Shitara; Saya Sekine; Fuka Nishiyama; Maho Kobayashi; Nina Lowrey; Shoka Fukada	Water polo	Women's tournament	24 September
Silver	Nozomi Tanaka	Athletics	Women's 10,000 m	24 September
Silver	Miwa Harimoto; Mima Ito; Hina Hayata; Miyu Nagasaki; Rin Mende	Table tennis	Women's team	24 September
Silver	Taishi Tanada; Masaya Tanaka	Canoeing	Men's K-2 500 m	25 September
Silver	Tatsuumi Soejima	Cycling	Men's cross-country	25 September
Silver	Misa Nishiyama	Gymnastics	Women's floor	25 September
Silver	Shinnosuke Oka	Gymnastics	Men's parallel bars	25 September
Silver	Rio Shirai; Satomi Suzuki; Rikako Ikee; Nagisa Ikemoto; Chiho Mizoguchi	Swimming	Women's 4 × 100 m medley relay	25 September
Silver	Kazushi Imafuku	Swimming	Men's 400 m freestyle	25 September
Silver	Shinnosuke Oka	Gymnastics	Men's horizontal bar	25 September
Silver	Nanaka Kajiki	Athletics	Women's heptathlon	25 September
Silver	Shota Fukuda	Athletics	Men's hammer throw	25 September
Silver	Senri Ikuma; Haruki Suyama	Diving	Men's synchronized 3 m springboard	26 September
Silver	Masanori Miyamoto	Weightlifting	Men's 70 kg	26 September
Silver	Kojiro Higuchi; Daichi Nakayama; Akihito Sawada	Esports	Competitive Martial Arts	26 September
Silver	Kento Yoshida; Hayato Tsubo; Mao Kokubo; Shido Tsumori	Fencing	Men's team sabre	26 September
Silver	Miyu Okamoto; Maika Miura; Ami Tsuneta; Takako Sato; Ufuoma Tanaka; Riho Akagi; Nana Santa; Mona Tateyama; Mio Shiraishi; Maho Awatani; Suzuno Higuchi; Haru Owaki	Basketball	Women's tournament	26 September
Silver	Manato Miyao	Athletics	Men's triple jump	26 September
Silver	Miharu Ozawa	Cycling	Women's BMX freestyle	27 September
Silver	Moe Higa; Tomoka Sato	Artistic swimming	Women's duet	27 September
Silver	Yumeka Oda	Skateboarding	Women's street	27 September
Silver	Kaede Ozawa	Cycling	Men's BMX freestyle	27 September
Silver	Toa Sasaki	Skateboarding	Men's street	27 September
Silver	Miyako Hatsumi; Arisa Kinjo; Kaho Nakayama; Naoko Sahara; Kaoru Wada; Natsuki Aizawa; Asuka Fujita; Sakura Hauge; Haruno Sasaki; Minami Matsuura; Clare Gray; Yuki Yoshidome; Ai Nakao; Aki Ueshima; Kaede Higa; Sora Ishikawa	Handball	Women's tournament	27 September
Silver	Tomokazu Harimoto; Hiroto Shinozuka	Table tennis	Men's doubles	27 September
Silver	Yui Sano; Yuina Kaneko; Misaki Emura; Seri Ozaki	Fencing	Women's team sabre	27 September
Silver	Megu Uyama	Gymnastics	Women's trampoline	27 September
Silver	Ryosuke Aizawa; Ryo Arima; Yoshiki Fuchigami; Ryosuke Fujisawa; Shogo Fukui; Shin Higuchi; Mizuki Kato; Shuichiro Kayo; Kazuki Kondo; Toyo Kumada; Masashi Maruyama; Wataru Matsuda; Shohei Mizutani; Motoki Mukoyama; Kento Nagano; Yuki Sato; Masato Shibasaki; Manami Soeda; Koki Taniwaki; Yuki Tsujimoto; Keita Wada; Kenta Yamada; Yukiya Yano	Baseball	Men's tournament	27 September
Silver	Rachid Muratake	Athletics	Men's 110 m hurdles	27 September
Silver	Hitomi Nakajima	Athletics	Women's 100 m hurdles	27 September
Silver	Haruka Kitaguchi	Athletics	Women's javelin throw	27 September
Silver	Kaho Aitaka; Moka Fujii; Moe Higa; Konatsu Ishii; Yuka Kawase; Uta Kobayashi; Tomoka Sato; Ayano Shimada	Artistic swimming	Team	28 September
Silver	Hyoga Kiuchi	Cycling	Men's BMX racing	28 September
Silver	Miwa Harimoto; Hina Hayata	Table tennis	Women's doubles	28 September
Silver	Taiju Goto	Athletics	Men's 400 m hurdles	28 September
Silver	Ryoma Aoki	Athletics	Men's 3000 m steeplechase	28 September
Silver	Nozomi Tanaka	Athletics	Women's 5000 m	28 September
Silver	Akane Yamaguchi	Badminton	Women's singles	29 September
Silver	Tomonori Yamaguchi	Athletics	Men's 5000 m	29 September
Silver	Yoshitaku Nagasako; Minato Nakaishi; Kaiya Ota; Kanata Takahashi	Cycling	Men's team sprint	29 September
Silver	Mizuki Ikeda; Yumi Kajihara; Maho Kakita; Tsuyaka Uchino; Misaki Okamoto	Cycling	Women's team pursuit	30 September
Silver	Yuuki Tanaka	Canoeing	Men's kayak single	30 September
Silver	Naoki Kojima; Kazushige Kuboki; Shoi Matsuda; Kanta Umezawa; Shoki Kawano	Cycling	Men's team pursuit	30 September
Silver	Rikuto Tamai	Diving	Men's 10 m platform	30 September
Silver	Ryo Kamiya; Yuto Awata; Masumi Konuma; Masahiro Uemura; Ryuhi Oyama; Kentaro Maeda; Masaki Uenaka	Esports	Identity V	30 September
Silver	Kyotaro Sogabe	Wrestling	Men's Greco-Roman 67 kg	30 September
Silver	Ai Mori	Sport climbing	Women's boulder	1 October
Silver	Nao Kusaka	Wrestling	Men's Greco-Roman 77 kg	1 October
Silver	Mina Sato	Cycling	Women's sprint	2 October
Silver	Hyoga Ota	Judo	Men's +100 kg	2 October
Silver	Hayato Ishiguro	Wrestling	Men's freestyle 86 kg	2 October
Silver	Junya Nakanishi	Archery	Men's individual recurve	3 October
Silver	Masato Kozono	Sailing	Boys' windsurfing	3 October
Silver	Natsumi Funazawa; Natsuko Funazawa	Sailing	Girls' skiff	3 October
Silver	Akari Oshima	Sailing	Girls' windsurfing	3 October
Silver	Ai Mori	Sport climbing	Women's lead	3 October
Silver	Ayumi Fukushima	Breaking	B-Girls	3 October
Silver	Rui Araki; Rei Umeki; Rion Ichihara; Hisatsugu Ishii; Yumeki Yokoyama; Yuto Ozeki; Yotaro Nakajima; Yudai Shimamoto; Uche Nwadike; Mihiro Sato; Tariqkanihayato Okabe	Football	Men's tournament	3 October
Silver	Kazuki Higa	Golf	Men's individual	3 October
Silver	Yuna Tanaka; Natsumi Hanamura; Kaseno Tanabe; Hisano Taguchi; Megumi Nishimoto	Gymnastics	Women's rhythmic group all-around	3 October
Silver	Satone Yoshida	Sport climbing	Men's lead	3 October
Silver	Shuko Aoyama; Yusuke Kusuhara	Tennis	Mixed doubles	3 October
Silver	Tatsunori Otsuka; Yudai Arai; Yudai Kawahigashi; Masato Kai; Keigo Nishimoto; Hiroto Nishiyama; Keihan Takahashi; Ryo Shimokawa; Rikuto Goto; Kento Asano; Keitaro Nishikawa; Kazuyuki Takahashi	Volleyball	Men's tournament	3 October
Silver	Yoshinosuke Aoyagi	Wrestling	Men's freestyle 74 kg	3 October
Bronze	Hinata Taichi; Misaki Nobata; Shiori Hirata	Shooting	Women's 10 m air rifle team	20 September
Bronze	Yuina Sakamoto	Teqball	Women's singles	20 September
Bronze	Manami Hayashi	Triathlon	Women's triathlon	20 September
Bronze	Misaki Uchida; Ayumu Saito; Yuho Yano	Modern pentathlon	Women's team	20 September
Bronze	Misa Okuzono	Swimming	Women's 200 m butterfly	20 September
Bronze	Ichika Kajimoto	Swimming	Women's 1500 m freestyle	20 September
Bronze	Shiho Matsumoto; Nagisa Ikemoto; Ayu Mizoguchi; Rio Suzuki; Rio Shirai; Miyu Namba	Swimming	Women's 4 × 100 m freestyle relay	20 September
Bronze	Daiki Hashimoto	Gymnastics	Men's individual all-around	21 September
Bronze	Sarara Shimada	Karate	Women's 61 kg	21 September
Bronze	Daisuke Murayama	Mixed martial arts	Men's traditional 65 kg	21 September
Bronze	Kaito Maruyama; Rio Maeda	Soft tennis	Mixed doubles	21 September
Bronze	Mio Narita	Swimming	Women's 200 m individual medley	21 September
Bronze	Naoki Hanakawa; Misaki Nobata	Shooting	Mixed 10 m air rifle team	22 September
Bronze	Misa Nishiyama	Gymnastics	Women's individual all-around	22 September
Bronze	Tamaki Terayama	Fencing	Women's individual épée	22 September
Bronze	Kyosuke Matsuyama	Fencing	Men's individual foil	22 September
Bronze	Rio Shirai	Swimming	Women's 200 m backstroke	22 September
Bronze	Ichika Kajimoto	Swimming	Women's 400 m freestyle	22 September
Bronze	Kazushi Imafuku	Swimming	Men's 1500 m freestyle	22 September
Bronze	Yuhi Todome	Cycling	Men's road race	23 September
Bronze	Yoshiaki Oiwa	Equestrian	Individual eventing	23 September
Bronze	Ekuya Kida; Yuga Chatani	Esports	eFootball	23 September
Bronze	Kiho Miyamae	Soft tennis	Women's singles	23 September
Bronze	Kotomi Kato	Swimming	Women's 100 m breaststroke	23 September
Bronze	Katsuhiro Matsumoto	Swimming	Men's 100 m butterfly	23 September
Bronze	Tatsuya Murasa	Swimming	Men's 200 m freestyle	23 September
Bronze	Mio Narita	Swimming	Women's 400 m individual medley	23 September
Bronze	Tatsuya Sakurama	Rowing	Men's single sculls	24 September
Bronze	Chika Yonezawa; Chiaki Tomita	Rowing	Women's lightweight double sculls	24 September
Bronze	Miho Ueno; Mao Kamidate; Hinako Ino; Mao Kadoya	Rowing	Women's quadruple sculls	24 September
Bronze	Masaya Tanaka; Akihiro Inoue; Ryuji Matsushiro; Yuito Sakai	Canoeing	Men's K-4 500 m	24 September
Bronze	Shuma Takata; Hirokazu Kobayashi; Ikki Mito; Yuki Sato; Shun Yuasa; Masaki Sasamoto; Wataru Narawa; Daishi Tamaki; Ryota Haruhara; Seiya Takano; Yota Ichikawa; Toshitaka Naito	Sepak takraw	Men's team regu	24 September
Bronze	Junnosuke Nakayama; Masaki Iwasa; Seiji Morikawa	Shooting	Men's 10 m air pistol team	24 September
Bronze	Shoma Tsukiyama	Gymnastics	Men's floor	24 September
Bronze	Tatsuya Murasa; Shuya Matsumoto; Katsuhiro Matsumoto; Shoon Mitsunaga; Kazusa Kuroda; Konosuke Yanagimoto; Kazushi Imafuku	Swimming	Men's 4 × 100 m freestyle relay	24 September
Bronze	Daiki Hashimoto	Gymnastics	Men's pommel horse	24 September
Bronze	Masaru Yamada	Fencing	Men's individual épée	24 September
Bronze	Misugu Okamoto	Skateboarding	Women's park	25 September
Bronze	Gunjo Shiji	Skateboarding	Men's park	25 September
Bronze	Mana Okamura	Gymnastics	Women's balance beam	25 September
Bronze	Shingo Hayashi; Akiko Yonemoto; Ryuma Hieda; Fumiyasu Nishiwaki	Equestrian	Team dressage	25 September
Bronze	Ichika Kajimoto	Swimming	Women's 800 m freestyle	25 September
Bronze	Rikako Ikee	Swimming	Women's 50 m butterfly	25 September
Bronze	Shin Ohashi	Swimming	Men's 50 m breaststroke	25 September
Bronze	Mikuni Yada	Athletics	Women's marathon	26 September
Bronze	Rin Fukuda; Akihiro Inoue	Canoeing	Mixed K-2 500 m	26 September
Bronze	Yuki Joseph Nakajima	Athletics	Men's 400 m	26 September
Bronze	Nozomi Tanaka	Athletics	Women's 1500 m	26 September
Bronze	Yukiko Umeno	Athletics	Women's marathon race walk	27 September
Bronze	Sora Matsushima; Shunsuke Togami	Table tennis	Men's doubles	27 September
Bronze	Motofumi Suwa	Athletics	Men's marathon race walk	27 September
Bronze	Miwa Harimoto	Table tennis	Women's singles	27 September
Bronze	Ginwoo Onodera	Skateboarding	Men's street	27 September
Bronze	Natsumi Kuroki	Kurash	Women's 57 kg	27 September
Bronze	Hina Hayata	Table tennis	Women's singles	27 September
Bronze	Satomi Watanabe	Squash	Women's singles	27 September
Bronze	Ryu Matsumoto; Koki Kano; Masaru Yamada; Seiya Asami	Fencing	Men's team épée	27 September
Bronze	Soshi Mizukubo	Athletics	Men's 200 m	27 September
Bronze	Sae Takemoto	Athletics	Women's javelin throw	27 September
Bronze	Kie Nakanishi; Rin Uesaka	Badminton	Women's doubles	28 September
Bronze	Ken Oyoshi	Kurash	Men's 81 kg	28 September
Bronze	Nagiya Mori	Athletics	Men's 1500 m	28 September
Bronze	Aiko Iki; Manaka Miura; Midori Mikase; Masumi Aoki	Athletics	Women's 4 × 100 m relay	28 September
Bronze	Tsukimi Namiki	Boxing	Women's 54 kg	29 September
Bronze	Minami Nonaka	Surfing	Women's shortboard	29 September
Bronze	Shunsuke Kitamoto	Boxing	Men's 60 kg	29 September
Bronze	Takumi Nakamura; Kota Nakata; Taiga Tsutaya; Tomoya Sakurai; Daisuke Tanaka; Adam Baig; Soya Ichihara; Naoki Sugioka; Jin Watanabe; Yuta Iwashita; Tatsuki Yoshino; Hayato Goto; Hiroyasu Tamakawa; Naoki Fujisaka; Akio Hashimoto; Kotaro Mizumachi	Handball	Men's tournament	29 September
Bronze	Sho Sakai	Diving	Men's 3 m springboard	29 September
Bronze	Joy McArthur	Athletics	Women's hammer throw	29 September
Bronze	Sewon Okazawa	Boxing	Men's 70 kg	30 September
Bronze	Sayaka Mikami	Diving	Women's 3 m springboard	30 September
Bronze	Kokoro Fujishiro	Judo	Women's 52 kg	30 September
Bronze	Tomoa Narasaki	Sport climbing	Men's boulder	30 September
Bronze	Yuiko Niwa	Taekwondo	Women's individual poomsae	1 October
Bronze	Satomi Watanabe; Akari Midorikawa; Risa Sugimoto; Erisa Sano	Squash	Women's team	1 October
Bronze	Mio Shirakane	Judo	Women's 57 kg	1 October
Bronze	Tatsuki Ishihara	Judo	Men's 73 kg	1 October
Bronze	Koki Saito; Eiken Sato; Taizo Sugitani	Equestrian	Team jumping	1 October
Bronze	Ayata Suzuki	Wrestling	Men's Greco-Roman 60 kg	1 October
Bronze	Akio Tanaka; Miyu Suzuki; Ikumi Matsu; Hanami Saito; Nanako Tateiwa; Emi Nishikori; Mayuri Horikawa; Shiho Kobayakawa; Mai Toriyama; Amiru Shimada; Akari Nakagomi; Hiroka Murayama; Saki Tanaka; Miyu Hasegawa; Yu Kudo; Maho Ueno; Rui Takashima; Haruka Kawaguchi	Field hockey	Women's tournament	2 October
Bronze	Miki Mukunoki	Judo	Women's +78 kg	2 October
Bronze	Minami Onda; Chinatsu Izawa; Chinatsu Toriumi; Patricia Nao Kawlu; Kayo Togami; Nagisa Makio	Sepak takraw	Women's quadrant	2 October
Bronze	Ruka Okamoto	Taekwondo	Women's 49 kg	2 October
Bronze	Hayato Matsuoka	Tennis	Men's singles	2 October
Bronze	Kotaro Kiyooka	Wrestling	Men's freestyle 65 kg	2 October
Bronze	Kota Kurosawa; Taito Mizumachi	Beach volleyball	Men's tournament	3 October
Bronze	Rina Niijima	Sailing	Women's windsurfing	3 October
Bronze	Kazuki Higa; Taishi Moto; Keita Nakajima	Golf	Men's team	3 October
Bronze	Tomu Takamoto; Aseri Masivou; Ren Ouchi; Naoya Ogita; Josua Kerevi; Takemichi Nakano; Koki Miyasaka; Toma Shiwachi; Ryodai Shirakuni; Taiki Yamaguchi; Haruhiko Uemura; Yoshiyuki Koga; Riku Tokito	Rugby sevens	Men's tournament	3 October
Bronze	Arash Yoshida	Wrestling	Men's freestyle 97 kg	3 October
Bronze	Akari Fujinami	Wrestling	Women's freestyle 57 kg	3 October

By sport events

Medals by sport
Sport	1st place, gold medalist(s)	2nd place, silver medalist(s)	3rd place, bronze medalist(s)	Total
Athletics	10	12	10	32
Judo	9	1	4	14
Cycling	8	9	1	18
Swimming	7	15	15	37
Wrestling	7	4	4	15
Fencing	6	2	4	12
Soft tennis	4	2	2	8
Gymnastics	3	10	5	18
Sailing	3	3	1	7
Sport climbing	2	3	1	6
Skateboarding	2	2	3	7
Canoeing	2	2	2	6
Esports	2	2	1	5
Karate	2	1	1	4
Tennis	2	1	1	4
Surfing	2	0	1	3
Table tennis	1	3	3	6
Triathlon	1	1	1	3
Football	1	1	0	2
Breaking	1	1	0	2
Water polo	1	1	0	2
Boxing	1	0	3	4
Shooting	1	0	3	4
Sepak takraw	1	0	2	3
Rugby sevens	1	0	1	2
3x3 basketball	1	0	0	1
Padel	1	0	0	1
Softball	1	0	0	1
Diving	0	2	2	4
Badminton	0	2	1	3
Artistic swimming	0	2	0	2
Basketball	0	2	0	2
Volleyball	0	2	0	2
Wushu	0	2	0	2
Equestrian	0	1	3	4
Golf	0	1	1	2
Handball	0	1	1	2
Teqball	0	1	1	2
Archery	0	1	0	1
Baseball	0	1	0	1
Weightlifting	0	1	0	1
Rowing	0	0	3	3
Kurash	0	0	2	2
Squash	0	0	2	2
Taekwondo	0	0	2	2
Beach volleyball	0	0	1	1
Field hockey	0	0	1	1
Mixed martial arts	0	0	1	1
Modern pentathlon	0	0	1	1
Total	83	95	91	269

Gender

Medals by gender
Gender	1st place, gold medalist(s)	2nd place, silver medalist(s)	3rd place, bronze medalist(s)	Total
Female	35	37	46	118
Male	44	53	41	138
Mixed	4	5	4	13
Total	83	95	91	269

Timeline

Medals by day
Day	Date	1st place, gold medalist(s)	2nd place, silver medalist(s)	3rd place, bronze medalist(s)	Total
1	September 20	6	7	7	20
2	September 21	2	5	5	12
3	September 22	3	4	7	14
4	September 23	4	8	7	19
5	September 24	5	9	10	24
6	September 25	8	8	6	22
7	September 26	3	8	4	15
8	September 27	6	13	10	29
9	September 28	5	5	4	14
10	September 29	3	3	6	12
11	September 30	5	5	4	14
12	October 1	8	2	5	15
13	October 2	13	4	6	23
14	October 3	12	13	6	31
Total		83	95	91	269

== Competitors ==
The following is a list of the number of competitors representing Japan that will participate at the Asian Games:

Sport	Men	Women	Total
3x3 basketball	4	4	8
Archery	4	4	8
Artistic swimming	0	10	10
Athletics	45	41	86
Badminton	10	10	20
Baseball	24	0	24
Basketball	12	12	24
Beach volleyball	4	4	8
Boxing	4	4	8
Breaking	2	2	4
Canoeing	11	9	20
Cricket	15	15	30
Cycling	19	18	37
Diving	7	2	9
Equestrian	11	1	12
Esports	25	0	25
Fencing	12	12	24
Field hockey	20	20	40
Football	23	23	46
Golf	3	3	6
Gymnastics	7	14	21
Handball	16	16	32
Judo	9	9	18
Ju-jitsu	6	3	9
Kabaddi	12	12	24
Karate	3	3	6
Kurash	2	3	5
Mixed martial arts	2	1	3
Modern pentathlon	4	4	8
Padel	4	4	8
Rowing	13	14	27
Rugby sevens	13	13	26
Sailing	10	10	20
Sepak takraw	12	12	24
Shooting	15	15	30
Skateboarding	4	4	8
Softball	0	17	17
Soft tennis	5	5	10
Sport climbing	6	5	11
Squash	4	4	8
Surfing	2	2	4
Swimming	16	17	33
Table tennis	5	5	10
Taekwondo	6	4	10
Tennis	6	6	12
Teqball	3	1	4
Triathlon	3	3	6
Volleyball	12	12	24
Water polo	15	15	30
Weightlifting	5	5	10
Wrestling	12	6	18
Wushu	3	4	7
Total	490	442	932

== Archery ==
In April 2026, the All Japan Archery Federation announced the archery squad, consisting of eight archers competing in the recurve and compound events.

Compound

Archer	Event	Ranking Round		Round of 64	Round of 32	Round of 16	Quarter-finals	Semi-finals	Final / BM	
Archer	Event	Score	Seed	Opposition Score	Opposition Score	Opposition Score	Opposition Score	Opposition Score	Opposition Score	Rank
Naoki Kamoto	Men's individual	694	34Q	Mazuki (MAL); L 145–149	Did not advance					
Mariko Sato	Women's individual	667	44Q	Dolma (BHU); L 134–138	Did not advance					
Naoki Komoto; Mariko Sato	Mixed team	1361	14Q	—N/a		South Korea (KOR); L 150–160	Did not advance			

Recurve

Archer	Event	Ranking Round		Round of 64	Round of 32	Round of 16	Quarter-finals	Semi-finals	Final / BM	
Archer	Event	Score	Seed	Opposition Score	Opposition Score	Opposition Score	Opposition Score	Opposition Score	Opposition Score	Rank
Yuya Funahashi	Men's individual	677	14 Q	Bye	Shabani (IRI); L 2–6	Did not advance				
Aoshima Tetsuya	Men's individual	677	16	Did not advance						
Junya Nakanishi	Men's individual	684	7 Q	Bye	Nguyen (VIE); W 6–2	Saha (BAN); W 7–3	Tang (TPE); W 6–0	Chauhan (IND); W 7–1	Lee (KOR); L 2–6	2nd place, silver medalist(s)
Waka Sonoda	Women's individual	651	22	Did not advance						
Nanami Asakuno	Women's individual	678	2 Q	Bye	Bekbalieva (KGZ); W 6–0	Fallah (IRI); W 6–2	Huang (CHN); L 0–6	Did not advance		
Fuko Ohta	Women's individual	654	17 Q	Bye	Fallah (IRI); L 4–6	Did not advance				
Yuya Funahashi; Aoshima Tetsuya; Junya Nakanishi	Men's team	2038	3 Q	—N/a	Bye	Bhutan (BHU); W 6–0	Iran (IRI); L 3–5	Did not advance		
Sonoda Waka; Nanami Asakuno; Fuko Ohta	Women's team	1983	4 Q	—N/a		Bangladesh (BAN); L 4–5	Did not advance			
Fuko Ohta; Waka Sonoda; Aoshima Tetsuya; Nanami Asakuno; Junya Nakanishi	Mixed team	1362	3 Q	—N/a	Bye	Bangladesh (BAN); W 5–1	Philippines (PHI); W 5–3	India (IND); L 3–5	South Korea (KOR); L 1–5	4

Key

- Q = Qualified for the next round
- W = Win
- L = Loss

== Athletics ==
=== Results ===
Key

- Q = Qualified for the next round
- q = Qualified for the next round as a fastest loser or, in field events, by position without achieving the qualifying target
- GR = Asian Games record
- NR = National record
- PB = Personal best
- SB = Season best
- NM = No mark
- N/A = Round not applicable for the event

=== Men ===
==== Track and road events ====
Athlete	Event	Heat		Semifinals		Final	
Athlete	Event	Result	Rank	Result	Rank	Result	Rank
Yuki Koike	100 m	10.33	2 Q	10.31	3	Did not advance	
Shuhei Tada	100 m	10.41	3 Q	10.37	6	Did not advance	
Soshi Mizukubo	200 m	20.72	1 Q	20.37	1 Q	20.56 PB	3rd place, bronze medalist(s)
Akira Hayashi	200 m	21.19	2 Q	20.93	4	Did not advance	
Yuki Joseph Nakajima	400 m	45.53	2 Q	—N/a		45.22	3rd place, bronze medalist(s)
Shinya Hayashi	400 m	45.57	2 Q	—N/a		45.77	6
Ko Ochiai	800 m	1:45.90	1 Q	—N/a		1:44.48 GR	1st place, gold medalist(s)
Nanaki Man No	800 m	1:49.91	2 Q	—N/a		1:47.59	7
Kazuto Iizawa	1500 m	3:45.22	1 Q	—N/a		3:36.35 GR	1st place, gold medalist(s)
Nagiya Mori	1500 m	3:45.66	2 Q	—N/a		3:37.92	3rd place, bronze medalist(s)
Nagiya Mori	5000 m	—N/a				13:35.55	5
Tomonori Yamaguchi	5000 m	—N/a				13:31.43 SB	2nd place, silver medalist(s)
Yamato Yoshii	10,000 m	—N/a				29:06.64	5
Ichitaka Yamashita	Marathon	—N/a				2:10:49	1st place, gold medalist(s)
Yūya Yoshida	Marathon	—N/a				2:18:33	11
Toshikazu Yamanishi	Half marathon race walk	—N/a				1:28:01	2nd place, silver medalist(s)
Kento Yoshikawa	Half marathon race walk	—N/a				1:29:28	4
Hayato Katsuki	Marathon race walk	—N/a				3:03:36 SB	1st place, gold medalist(s)
Motofumi Suwa	Marathon race walk	—N/a				3:08:57	3rd place, bronze medalist(s)
Shunsuke Izumiya	110 m hurdles	DNF	—	—N/a		Did not advance	
Rachid Muratake	110 m hurdles	13.27	1 Q	—N/a		13.29	2nd place, silver medalist(s)
Kazuki Kurokawa	400 m hurdles	50.26	2 Q	—N/a		49.41	6
Taiju Goto	400 m hurdles	48.60	1 Q	—N/a		47.93 PB	2nd place, silver medalist(s)
Ryuji Miura	3000 m steeplechase	—N/a				8:17.36 GR	1st place, gold medalist(s)
Ryoma Aoki	3000 m steeplechase	—N/a				8:17.60	2nd place, silver medalist(s)
Shuhei Tada; Fukuto Komuro; Yoshihide Kiryū; Yuki Koike	4 × 100 m relay	38.71	1 Q	—N/a		38.57	5
Fuga Sato; Kentaro Shirahata; Kenki Imaizumi; Shinya Hayashi; Yuki Joseph Nakajima	4 × 400 m relay	3:03.48	1 Q	—N/a		3:00.75	1st place, gold medalist(s)

==== Field events ====
Athlete	Event	Qualification		Final	
Athlete	Event	Distance	Position	Distance	Position
Hirokazu Sakai	High jump	—N/a		2.22	4
Ryoichi Akamatsu	High jump	—N/a		2.10	7
Tomoya Karasawa	Pole vault	—N/a		5.35	9
Masaki Ejima	Pole vault	—N/a		5.25	12
Yuki Hashioka	Long jump	7.74	3 q	7.94	6
Riku Ito	Long jump	7.64	6 q	7.97 SB	5
Miyao Manato	Triple jump	—N/a		16.77 PB	2nd place, silver medalist(s)
Tsutsumi Yuji	Discus throw	—N/a		59.82	4
Yugami Masateru	Discus throw	—N/a		58.53	6
Shota Fukuda	Hammer throw	—N/a		71.78	2nd place, silver medalist(s)
Tatsuto Nakagawa	Hammer throw	—N/a		71.48	4
Yuta Sakiyama	Javelin throw	—N/a		78.74	5
Rin Suzuki	Javelin throw	—N/a		71.73	10

=== Women ===
==== Track and road events ====
Athlete	Event	Heat		Semifinals		Final	
Athlete	Event	Result	Rank	Result	Rank	Result	Rank
Midori Mikase	100 m	11.59	2 Q	11.43	3 Q	11.43	4
Abigail Fuka Ido	100 m	11.59	2 Q	11.64	5	Did not advance	
Aiko Iki	200 m	23.81	5	—N/a		Did not advance	
Abigeirufuka Ido	200 m	23.30	2 Q	—N/a		23.21	4
Nanako Matsumoto	400 m	53.48	2 Q	—N/a		54.29	7
Ayano Shiomi	800 m	2:02.81	1 Q	—N/a		2:05.76	5
Rin Kubo	800 m	2:02.87	4 q	—N/a		2:05.46	4
Nozomi Tanaka	1500 m	—N/a				4:06.14	3rd place, bronze medalist(s)
Mizuki Michishita	1500 m	—N/a				4:21.24	8
Nozomi Tanaka	5000 m	—N/a				15:11.65	2nd place, silver medalist(s)
Yuma Yamamoto	5000 m	—N/a				15:17.84	4
Nozomi Tanaka	10,000 m	—N/a				32:41.54	2nd place, silver medalist(s)
Ichitaka Yamashita	Marathon	2:10:49	1st place, gold medalist(s)				
Yūya Yoshida	Marathon	2:18:33	11				
Toshikazu Yamanishi	Half marathon race walk	1:28:01	2nd place, silver medalist(s)				
Kento Yoshikawa	Half marathon race walk	1:29:28	4				
Hayato Katsuki	Marathon race walk	3:03:36 SB	1st place, gold medalist(s)				
Motofumi Suwa	Marathon race walk	3:08:57	3rd place, bronze medalist(s)				
Hitomi Nakajima	100 m hurdles	12.85	1 Q	—N/a		12.78	2nd place, silver medalist(s)
Mako Fukube	100 m hurdles	12.85	1 Q	—N/a		12.74	1st place, gold medalist(s)
Honoka Aoki	400 m hurdles	56.46	3 Q	—N/a		56.24	6
Satsuki Umehara	400 m hurdles	56.59	5 q	—N/a		57.90	8
Miu Saito	3000 m steeplechase	—N/a				9:27.56 SB	5
Manami Nishiyama	3000 m steeplechase	—N/a				10:11.39	7
Masumi Aoki; Manaka Miura; Aiko Iki; Midori Mikase	4 × 100 m relay	43.65	2 Q	—N/a		43.52 SB	3rd place, bronze medalist(s)
Aoi Teramoto; Shizuho Moriyama; Nanako Matsumoto; Yuzuki Nakao	4 × 400 m relay	—N/a				3:31.44	4

==== Field events ====
Athlete	Event	Final	
Athlete	Event	Distance	Position
Yuzuki Ishioka	High jump	1.80	8
Nagisa Takahashi	High jump	1.80	9
Misaki Morota	Pole vault	4.55 PB	1st place, gold medalist(s)
Akari Osakaya	Pole vault	4.00	5
Sumire Hata	Long jump	6.39	5
Ayaka Kōra	Long jump	5.96	10
Akari Funada	Triple jump	13.42	6
Nanaka Kori	Discus throw	56.22	5
Joy McArthur	Hammer throw	68.42 SB	3rd place, bronze medalist(s)
Raika Murakami	Hammer throw	63.09	8
Haruka Kitaguchi	Javelin throw	62.70	2nd place, silver medalist(s)
Sae Takemoto	Javelin throw	62.15 SB	3rd place, bronze medalist(s)

=== Mixed ===
Athlete	Event	Heat		Final	
Athlete	Event	Result	Rank	Result	Rank
Fukuto Komuro; Midori Mikase; Yoshihide Kiryū; Abigeirufuka Ido	4 × 100m relay	41.70	3 Q	41.24 SB	5
Kentaro Shirahata; Aoi Teramoto; Kenki Imaizumi; Shizuho Moriyama	4 × 400m relay	3:16.52	3 Q	3:15.52	4

=== Combined events ===
==== Men ====
Athlete	Event	Category	100 m	LJ	SP	HJ	400 m	110H	DT	PV	JT	1,500 m	Total	Rank
Keisuke Okuda	Decathlon	Result	10.67	7.12	13.09	1.79	49.38	14.47	43.91	4.50	46.97	5:39.13	7230	7
Keisuke Okuda	Decathlon	Points	935	842	673	619	843	915	744	760	544	355	7230	7
Yuma Maruyama	Decathlon	Result	10.75	7.12	14.03	2.00	48.28	14.00	44.21	5.10	47.29	4:33.92	8123	1st place, gold medalist(s)
Yuma Maruyama	Decathlon	Points	917	842	730	803	896	975	751	941	549	719	8123	1st place, gold medalist(s)

==== Women ====
Athlete	Event	Category	100H	HJ	SP	200 m	LJ	JT	800 m	Total	Rank
Nanaka Kajiki	Heptathlon	Result	13.17	1.62	11.08	24.84	5.48	46.88	2:20.33	5673	2nd place, silver medalist(s)
Nanaka Kajiki	Heptathlon	Points	1099	759	600	902	694	800	819	5673	2nd place, silver medalist(s)
Yuri Tanaka	Heptathlon	Result	13.99	1.68	11.67	25.60	5.80	55.39	2:15.61	5920	1st place, gold medalist(s)
Yuri Tanaka	Heptathlon	Points	980	830	639	833	789	965	884	5920	1st place, gold medalist(s)

== Badminton ==
In May 2026, the Badminton Association of Japan announced a 20-member squad for the Games based on rankings and performances.

Singles

Athlete	Event	Round of 64	Round of 32	Round of 16	Quarter-finals	Semi-finals	Final	
Athlete	Event	Opposition Score	Opposition Score	Opposition Score	Opposition Score	Opposition Score	Opposition Score	Rank
Kodai Naraoka	Men	Bye	Lee C Y (HKG); W 21–17, 11–21, 21–18	Rostampourlagaldani (IRI); W 21–11, 21–16	Yoo (KOR); L 21–12, 5–21, 11–21	Did not advance		
Kenta Nishimoto	Men	Bye	Farhan (INA); L 12–21, 10–21	Did not advance				
Tomoka Miyazaki	Women	Bye	Kherlenbaatar (MGL); W 21–5, 21–5	Sindhu (IND); L 9–21, 13–21	Did not advance			
Akane Yamaguchi	Women	Bye	Shooridehziabari (IRI); W 21–5, 21–9	Pui (MAC); W 21–12, 21–12	Hooda (IND); W 21–16, 14–21, 21–17	Wang (CHN); W 21–11, 22–20	An (KOR); L 17–21, 9–21	2nd place, silver medalist(s)

Doubles

Athlete	Event	Round of 32	Round of 16	Quarter-finals	Semi-finals	Final	
Athlete	Event	Opposition Score	Opposition Score	Opposition Score	Opposition Score	Opposition Score	Rank
Takuro Hoki; Yugo Kobayashi	Men	Jumar / Ohidul (BAN); W 21–9, 21–11	Goh / Izzuddin (MAS); L 19–21, 16–21	Did not advance			
Kakeru Kumagai; Hiroki Nishi	Men	Hung / Lui (HKG); W 21–19, 19–21, 21–12	Lee J-h / Yang (TPE); W 20–22, 21–17, 21–12	Kim / Seo (KOR); L 21–15, 17–21, 15–21	Did not advance		
Yuki Fukushima; Mayu Matsumoto	Women	Bye	Gopichand / Jolly (IND); L 22–24, 18–21	Did not advance			
Kie Nakanishi; Rin Uesaka	Women	Phạm T D / Phạm T K (VIE); W 21–15, 21–8	Jia / Zhang (CHN); W 9–21, 21–18, 21–15	Yeung N / Yeung P (HKG); W 21–15, 19–21, 21–15	Baek / Lee S-h (KOR); L 13–21, 12–21	Did not advance	3rd place, bronze medalist(s)
Yuichi Shimogami; Sayaka Hobara	Mixed	Bayarsaikhan / Ganbaatar (MGL); W 21–4, 21–4	Ye / Chan (TPE); L 10–21, 15–21	Did not advance			
Yuta Watanabe; Maya Taguchi	Mixed	Puavaranukroh / Paewsampran (THA); W 21–16, 21–12	Syahnawi / Marwah (INA); L 21–9, 18–21, 15–21	Did not advance			

Team

Athlete	Event	Round of 16	Quarter-finals	Semi-finals	Final	
Athlete	Event	Opposition Score	Opposition Score	Opposition Score	Opposition Score	Rank
Kodai Naraoka; Kenta Nishimoto; Yushi Tanaka; Koki Watanabe; Takuro Hoki; Yugo Kobayashi; Kakeru Kumagai; Hiroki Nishi; Yuichi Shimogami; Yuta Watanabe	Men	Kazakhstan (KAZ); W 3–0	India (IND); L 0–3	Did not advance		
Akane Yamaguchi; Tomoka Miyazaki; Riko Gunji; Nozomi Okuhara; Yuki Fukushima; Mayu Matsumoto; Kie Nakanishi; Rin Uesaka; Sayaka Hobara; Maya Taguchi	Women	Bye	India (IND); W 3–0	South Korea (KOR); W 3–1	China (CHN); L 0–3	2nd place, silver medalist(s)

== Baseball ==
Summary

Team	Event	Preliminary round				Super / Consolation Round			Final / BM	
Team	Event	Opposition Score	Opposition Score	Opposition Score	Rank	Opposition Score	Opposition Score	Rank	Opposition Score	Rank
Japan men's	Men's tournament	China; W 11–3	Palestine; W 15–0	Philippines; W 7–0	1 Q	South Korea; W 5–0	Chinese Taipei; W 7–3	1 Q	South Korea; L 1–3	2nd place, silver medalist(s)

== Basketball ==
Both of Japan's men's and women's national basketball teams will play at the 2026 Asian Games. Japan will send a secondary team in the women's team event coached by Yuko Oga, since the main team coached by Corey Gaines has commitments to the 2026 FIBA Women's Basketball World Cup.

Summary

Team	Event	Group stage				Play-ins	Quarter-finals	Semi-finals	Final / BM	
Team	Event	Opposition Score	Opposition Score	Opposition Score	Rank	Opposition Score	Opposition Score	Opposition Score	Opposition Score	Rank
Japan men's	Men's 5x5	Indonesia; W 98–53	Saudi Arabia; W 86–80	South Korea; L 83–100	2 Q	—N/a	Chinese Taipei; W 85–78	China; W 97–78	South Korea; L 57–67	2nd place, silver medalist(s)
Japan women's	Women's 5x5	Hong Kong; W 114–37	Kazakhstan; W 88–23	Philippines; 89–67	1 Q	—N/a	Thailand; W 86–29	Chinese Taipei; W 80–52	South Korea; L 70–75	2nd place, silver medalist(s)
Japan men's	Men's 3x3	Singapore; W 21–17	South Korea; L 12–21	Thailand; W 21–19	2 Q	Kazakhstan; W 18–17	Iran; L 3–21	Did not advance		
Japan women's	Women's 3x3	Chinese Taipei; L 8–12	Iran; L 16–18	Uzbekistan; W 19–11	3 Q	Malaysia; W 13–9	China; W 17–16	South Korea; W 19–8	Philippines; W 21–11	1st place, gold medalist(s)

=== 5×5 basketball ===
Japan men's and women's team were drawn in the group A and B respectively.

==== Men's tournament ====
Team roster

The following is Japan roster in the men's basketball tournament of the 2026 Asian Games.

Japan men's national basketball team – 2026 Asian Games roster
Players
Coaches

Pos.	No.	Name	Age – Date of birth	Height	Club	Ctr.
PG	3	Kotetsu Kurokawa	25 – 8 April 2001	1.75 m (5 ft 9 in)	Altiri Chiba	(Japan)
PG	5	John Harper Jr.	23 – 9 February 2003	1.81 m (5 ft 11 in)	Tokyo Sunrockers	(Japan)
SF	13	Ren Kanechika	23 – 11 March 2003	1.97 m (6 ft 6 in)	Chiba Jets	(Japan)
C	14	Toyoshige Kano	24 – 6 October 2001	2.06 m (6 ft 9 in)	Tokyo Sunrockers	(Japan)
SF	20	Ibu Yamazaki	23 – 10 July 2003	2.00 m (6 ft 7 in)	Tokyo Sunrockers	(Japan)
PF	25	Yuto Kawashima	21 – 27 May 2005	2.00 m (6 ft 7 in)	Seattle Redhawks	(United States)
SG	28	Kazuma Tsuya	28 – 7 June 1998	1.91 m (6 ft 3 in)	San-en NeoPhoenix	(Japan)
PG	31	Atsuya Ogawa	24 – 24 June 2002	1.90 m (6 ft 3 in)	Utsunomiya Brex	(Japan)
C	32	Avi Schafer	28 – 28 January 1998	2.06 m (6 ft 9 in)	Sendai 89ers	(Japan)
SG	45	Jaheru Yamauchi	23 – 5 December 2002	1.90 m (6 ft 3 in)	Kawasaki Brave Thunders	(Japan)
C	53	Alex Kirk	34 – 14 November 1991	2.11 m (6 ft 11 in)	Kawasaki Brave Thunders	(Japan)
SG	64	Shinji Takashima	25 – 13 October 2000	1.91 m (6 ft 3 in)	Utsunomiya Brex	(Japan)

Head coach

- (Japan) Daisuke Yoshimoto

Assistant coach(es)

- (Japan) Ken Hamanaka
- (United States) Kevin Anzenberger
- (Japan) Shinji Tomiyama

Legend

- (C) Team captain
- Club - describes last
  club before the tournament
- Age - describes age
  on 10 September 2026

Group play

Pos	Team	Pld	W	L	PF	PA	PD	Pts	Qualification
1	South Korea	3	3	0	284	197	+87	6	Quarterfinals
2	Japan (H)	3	2	1	267	233	+34	5	Quarterfinals
3	Saudi Arabia	3	1	2	246	257	−11	4	Quarterfinals
4	Indonesia	3	0	3	190	300	−110	3	

Source: AsianGames2026.org
(H) Hosts

10 September 2026
19:00

Report
Box score

Japan	98–53	Indonesia
Scoring by quarter: 29–9, 26–12, 20–14, 23–18
Pts: Tsuya 23; Rebs: Kawashima 9 Asts: Kurokawa 10		Pts: Prosper 13; Rebs: Xzavierro 5 Asts: Beane, Saputera 3

Aichi International Arena, Nagoya
Referees: Yuen Chun Yip (HKG), Mohammad Taha (JOR), Rakesh Ramalingaiah (IND)

11 September 2026
19:00

Report
Box score

Saudi Arabia	80–86	Japan
Scoring by quarter: 15–25, 20–26, 20–17, 25–18
Pts: Abdur-Rahkman 29; Rebs: Al-Suwailem 12; Asts: Al-Marwani 5		Pts: Kirk 23; Rebs: Kirk 10; Asts: Kurokawa 8

Aichi International Arena, Nagoya
Attendance: 9,177
Referees: Glenn Cornelio (PHI), Yuen Chun Yip (HKG), Nattapong Jontapa (THA)

13 September 2026
19:00

Report
Box score

Japan	83–100	South Korea
Scoring by quarter: 17–19, 25–21, 24–31, 17–29
Pts: Kurokawa 21; Rebs: Kirk 12; Asts: Harper 6		Pts: Lee J. 25; Rebs: Jang 8 Asts: Lee H., Lee J. 7

Aichi International Arena, Nagoya
Attendance: 8,182
Referees: Nattapong Jontapa (THA), Mohammad Taha (JOR), Mandy Ngieng (MAS)

==== Women's tournament ====
Team roster

The following is the Japan roster in the women's basketball tournament of the 2026 Asian Games.

Japan women's national basketball team – 2026 Asian Games roster
Players
Coaches

Pos.	No.	Name	Age – Date of birth	Height	Club	Ctr.
PG	9	Riho Akagi	28 – 4 August 1998	1.67 m (5 ft 6 in)	Fujitsu Red Wave	(Japan)
PG	13	Ami Tsuneta (C)	26 – 18 September 1999	1.65 m (5 ft 5 in)	Denso Iris	(Japan)
SG	15	Maika Miura	25 – 13 August 2001	1.70 m (5 ft 7 in)	Toyota Antelopes	(Japan)
PF	16	Ufuoma Tanaka	24 – 10 February 2002	1.80 m (5 ft 11 in)	Toyota Antelopes	(Japan)
SF	17	Nana Santa	23 – 2 October 2002	1.79 m (5 ft 10 in)	Eneos Sunflowers	(Japan)
SF	19	Mona Tateyama	23 – 6 November 2002	1.78 m (5 ft 10 in)	Hitachi High-Tech Cougars	(Japan)
C	30	Mio Shiraishi	20 – 17 April 2006	1.84 m (6 ft 0 in)	Denso Iris	(Japan)
PF	36	Maho Awatani	23 – 6 December 2002	1.82 m (6 ft 0 in)	Hitachi High-Tech Cougars	(Japan)
PG	74	Suzuno Higuchi	25 – 12 June 2001	1.64 m (5 ft 5 in)	Hitachi High-Tech Cougars	(Japan)
SG	75	Takako Sato	24 – 19 July 2002	1.76 m (5 ft 9 in)	Prestige International Aranmare Akita	(Japan)
PF	77	Miyu Okamoto	25 – 23 April 2001	1.79 m (5 ft 10 in)	Toyota Antelopes	(Japan)
PF	91	Haru Owaki	22 – 4 March 2004	1.78 m (5 ft 10 in)	Fujitsu Red Wave	(Japan)

Head coach

- (Japan) Yuko Oga

Assistant coach(es)

- (Japan) Hirohisa Takada

Legend

- (C) Team captain
- Club – describes last
  club before the tournament
- Age – describes age
  on 10 September 2026

Group play

Pos	Team	Pld	W	L	PF	PA	PD	Pts	Qualification
1	Japan (H)	3	3	0	291	127	+164	6	Quarterfinals
2	Philippines	3	2	1	243	220	+23	5	Quarterfinals
3	Kazakhstan	3	1	2	161	251	−90	4	
4	Hong Kong	3	0	3	187	284	−97	3	

Source: aichi-nagoya2026.org
(H) Hosts

17 September 2026
19:00

Report
Results

Japan	114–37	Hong Kong
Scoring by quarter: 32–11, 37–6, 20–7, 25–13
Pts: Tateyama 26; Rebs: Okamoto 9 Asts: Higuchi 7		Pts: Kwan 10; Rebs: Tong 5 Asts: Li, Tsui 2

Aichi International Arena, Nagoya
Attendance: 1,549
Referees: Lee Ji-youn (KOR), Mandy Ngieng (MAS), Mahsa Kargari (IRI)

20 September 2026
13:50

Report
Results

Kazakhstan	23–88	Japan
Scoring by quarter: 9–23, 6–25, 5–23, 3–17
Pts: Amanzholova 6 Rebs: Bezgodova 6 Asts: Amanzholova 2		Pts: Owaki 16; Rebs: Okamoto, Tateyama 4 Asts: Akagi, Tsuneta 6

Aichi International Arena, Nagoya
Attendance: 7,360
Referees: Wissam Zein (SYR), Chuang Chih-Chun (TPE), Hu Jing (CHN)

22 September 2026
13:00

Report
Results

Japan	89–67	Philippines
Scoring by quarter: 24–11, 28–21, 16–18, 21–17
Pts: Okamoto 19; Rebs: Tanaka 8 Asts: Miura, Higuchi 5		Pts: Means 16; Rebs: Means 9 Asts: Berberabe 5

Aichi International Arena, Nagoya
Attendance: 5,897
Referees: Lee Jiyoun (KOR), Rabah Noujaim (LBN), Hu Jing (CHN)

=== 3x3 basketball ===
==== Men's tournament ====
Group play

Pos	Team	Pld	W	L	PF	PA	PD	Pts	Qualification
1	South Korea	3	3	0	61	37	+24	6	Quarterfinals
2	Japan	3	2	1	54	57	−3	5	Play-ins
3	Singapore	3	1	2	52	50	+2	4	Play-ins
4	Thailand	3	0	3	40	63	−23	3	

Source: asiangames2026.org

22 September
18:30

Report

Japan	21–17	Singapore
Pts: Tokumoto 7		Pts: Mohamed 6

Kinjō-futō Station Square, Nagoya
Referees: Kim Gain (KOR), Nie Cong (CHN)

22 September
20:35

Report

Japan	12–21	South Korea
Pts: Roy 7		Pts: Lee J. 9

Kinjō-futō Station Square, Nagoya
Referees: Nie Cong (CHN), Danusorn Laosaksam (THA)

23 September
20:35

Report

Japan	21–19	Thailand
Pts: Roy 10		Pts: Ejesu 8

Kinjō-futō Station Square, Nagoya
Referees: Alexandr Rulyov (KAZ), Su Yeyen (TPE)

==== Women's tournament ====
Group play

Pos	Team	Pld	W	L	PF	PA	PD	Pts	Qualification
1	Iran	3	3	0	51	31	+20	6	Quarterfinals
2	Chinese Taipei	3	2	1	37	34	+3	5	Play-ins
3	Japan	3	1	2	43	41	+2	4	Play-ins
4	Uzbekistan	3	0	3	28	53	−25	3	

Source: 2026 Asian Games

21 September
17:40

Report

Japan	8–12	Chinese Taipei
Pts: Yamamoto 4		Pts: Tsai 5

Kinjō-futō Station Square, Nagoya
Referees: Alexandr Rulyov (KAZ), Liu Chee (MAS)

21 September
19:20

Report

Chinese Taipei	15–12	Uzbekistan
Pts: Chang 7		Pts: Lapatnikova, Mambetnazarova 4

Kinjō-futō Station Square, Nagoya
Referees: Alexandr Rulyov (KAZ), Neoh Yuen (MAS)

23 September
13:40

Report

Chinese Taipei	10–14	Iran
Pts: Chen 4		Pts: Nouri 6

Kinjō-futō Station Square, Nagoya
Referees: Kim Ga-in (KOR), Neoh Yuen (MAS)

== Cricket ==
Japan qualified a men's and women's cricket teams. Both teams qualified as the host nation.

Summary

Team	Event	Group Stage			Quarter-finals	Semi-finals	Final / BM	
Team	Event	Opposition Score	Opposition Score	Rank	Opposition Score	Opposition Score	Opposition Score	Rank
Japan men's	Men's tournament	Afghanistan; L by 48 runs	Nepal; NR	3	Did not advance			10
Japan women's	Women's tournament	—N/a			India; L by 8 wickets	Did not advance		7

=== Men's tournament ===
Roster
The roster consisted of 15 athletes.

- Kendel Kadowaki-Fleming
- Charlie Hara-Hinze
- Benjamin Ito-Davis
- Alester Kadowaki-Fleming
- Kohei Kubota
- Jake Kusuda-Nairn
- Wataru Miyauchi (wk)
- Reo Sakurano-Thomas
- Alex Shirai-Patmore (wk)
- Shoma Sugaya-Slater
- Declan Suzuki
- Tsuyoshi Takada
- Ibrahim Takahashi
- Makoto Taniyama
- Lachlan Yamamoto-Lake

Group stage

Match 1
24 September 2026
09:00
Scorecard

Afghanistan; 129/6 (20 overs)	v	Japan; 81 (19.3 overs)
Mohammad Akram 34 (29); Shoma Sugaya-Slater 2/18 (3 overs)		Reo Sakurano-Thomas 23 (24); Arab Gul 4/8 (4 overs)

Afghanistan won by 48 runs
Kōrogi Sports Park, Nisshin
Umpires: Faisal Afridi (Pak) and Nitin Menon (Ind)

- Japan won the toss and elected to field.

Match 5
26 September 2026
09:00
Scorecard

Nepal; 149/4 (15 overs)	v	Japan
Sundeep Jora 57* (32); Reo Sakurano-Thomas 1/7 (2 overs)

No result
Kōrogi Sports Park, Nisshin
Umpires: Faisal Afridi (Pak) and Prageeth Rambukwella (SL)

- Japan won the toss and elected to field.
- The match was reduced to 15 overs per side due to rain.
- No further play was possible due to rain.

=== Women's tournament ===
Roster
The roster consisted of 15 athletes.

- Mai Yanagida
- Erika Oda
- Ahilya Chandel
- Ayumi Fujikawa
- Hinase Goto
- Haruna Iwasaki
- Shimako Kato
- Ayaka Kato-Stafford
- Elena Kusuda-Nairn
- Akari Nishimura
- Meg Ogawa
- Kurumi Ota
- Seika Sumi
- Erika Toguchi-Quinn
- Nonoha Yasumoto

Quarter-finals

Quarter-final 4
18 September 2026
14:00
Scorecard

Japan; 57 (19.5 overs)	v	India; 59/2 (5 overs)
Ayaka Kato-Stafford 25 (47); Shree Charani 4/10 (4 overs)		Shafali Verma 40* (15); Nonoha Yasumoto 1/8 (2 overs)

India won by 8 Wickets
Kōrogi Sports Park, Nisshin
Umpires: Shathira Jakir (Ban) and Shivani Mishra (Qat)

- India won the toss and elected to field.
- This was the first time India and Japan faced each other in WT20Is.

== Esports ==
The Japan eSports Union confirmed that Japan will participate in seven out of nine events in esports. Japan did not enter and/or qualify a team for Honor of Kings, League Of Legends, Mobile Legends: Bang Bang, and Naraka: Bladepoint.

Rosters

Japan national esports team – 2026 Asian Games roster
Players
Coaches

Name	Game	Team
Ekuya Kida	eFootball	(South Korea) Kiwoom DRX
Yuuga Chatani	eFootball	(Japan) Nagoya OJA
Shunpei Hashiki	eFootball	(South Korea) Kiwoom DRX
Kojiro Higuchi	Street Fighter 6*	(Japan) Zeta Division
Daichi Nakayama	Tekken 8*	(Japan) Team Yamasa
Akihito Sawada	The King of Fighters XV*	(Japan) Amaterasu Gaming
Ryota Kokubun	Gran Turismo 7	—
Hayato Awata	Identity V	(Japan) Reject
Mao Kaminaka	Identity V	(Japan) Fennel
Ryo Kamiya	Identity V	(Japan) Reject
Masumi Onuma	Identity V	(Japan) Reject
Kentaro Maeda	Identity V	(Japan) Fennel
Masahiro Kamimura	Identity V	(Japan) Reject
Ryuhi Oyama	Identity V	(Japan) Arneb with WoG
Kaito Toba	Pokémon Unite	(Japan) Fennel
Yudai Koseko	Pokémon Unite	(Japan) Fennel
Renta Azuma	Pokémon Unite	(Japan) Fennel
Shoki Takada	Pokémon Unite	(Japan) Fennel
Hiroki Sato	Pokémon Unite	(Japan) Reject
Mashika Shirakawa	Pokémon Unite	(Japan) Fennel
Tomoki Ishikawa	PUBG Mobile	(Japan) Making the Road
Toma Adachi	PUBG Mobile	(Japan) Making the Road
Tetsunori Shoda	PUBG Mobile	(Japan) Making the Road
Eigo Tagashira	PUBG Mobile	(Japan) Making the Road
Daisuke Ohashi	PUBG Mobile	(Japan) Reject
Yuki Kurihara	Puyo Puyo Champions	(Japan) Tokyo Verdy

Head coach

  - Toshiki Mikami (Identity V)
  - Haruki Yoshiura (Pokemon Unite)
  - Yasutaka Mochizuki (PUBG Mobile)

Legend

- Team – describes last
  team before the tournament
- (*) Part of the event "Competitive Martial Arts"

Roster

== Field hockey ==
Summary

Key:

- s.o. – Match decided by penalty-shootout.

Team	Event	Group Stage						Semi-final	Final / BM / Pl		
Team	Event	Opposition Result	Opposition Result	Opposition Result	Opposition Result	Opposition Result	Rank	Opposition Result	Opposition Result	Opposition Result	Rank
Men's team	Men's tournament	Sri Lanka; W 9–0	Bangladesh; W 6–1	Indonesia; W 12–1	India; L 0–2	South Korea; L 2–3	3	—N/a	5/8^{th} classification Thailand; W 9–1	5/6^{th} classification China; W 5–0	5
Women's team	Women's tournament	Indonesia; W 7–0	Singapore; W 5–0	Uzbekistan; W 7–1	India; L 1–3	Thailand; W 3–0	2 Q	China; D 0–0 (2–4 s.o.)	Third place match South Korea; D 0–0 (4–2 s.o.)		3rd place, bronze medalist(s)

=== Men's tournament ===
Team squads

The following is the Japan roster in the men's field hockey tournament of the 2026 Asian Games.

Head coach: (Japan) Yoshihiro Anai

1. Koji Yamasaki
2. Shota Yamada
4. Yamato Kawahara
5. Seren Tanaka
6. Naru Kimura
7. Jun Watanabe
8. Taiki Takade
9. Kosei Kawabe
11. Kazumasa Matsumoto
12. Yuma Nagai
13. Manabu Yamashita
14. Raiki Fujishima (C)
16. Hiro Saito
18. Tsubasa Tanaka
19. Ryoma Ooka
22. Kaito Tanaka
23. Yusuke Kawamura
29. Takumi Kitagawa (GK)
30. Takashi Yoshikawa (GK)
38. Hyota Yamada

Preliminary round

Pos	Team	Pld	W	D	L	GF	GA	GD	Pts	Qualification
1	India	5	5	0	0	49	4	+45	15	Semi-finals
2	South Korea	5	4	0	1	20	10	+10	12	Semi-finals
3	Japan (H)	5	3	0	2	29	7	+22	9	Fifth place classification
4	Bangladesh	5	2	0	3	9	23	−14	6	Fifth place classification
5	Sri Lanka	5	1	0	4	6	38	−32	3	Ninth place game
6	Indonesia	5	0	0	5	6	37	−31	0	Eleventh place game

Source: FIH
Rules for classification: 1) points; 2) matches won; 3) goal difference; 4) goals for; 5) head-to-head result; 6) field goals for.
(H) Hosts

20 September 2026
17:00

Japan	9–0	Sri Lanka
Kimura 15'; Yamasaki 18', 29', 46', 58'; Fujishima 25'; Kawabe 48'; S. Tanaka 51'; Ooka 55'	Report

Gifu Prefectural Green Stadium
Umpires:
Mohammad Shahbaz Ali (BAN)
Haroon Rashid (PAK)

22 September 2026
17:00

Japan	6–1	Bangladesh
Kawabe 1', 58'; Yamasaki 6'; Kimura 15'; Watanabe 29'; Matsumoto 41'	Report	Rakin 44'

Gifu Prefectural Green Stadium
Umpires:
Sean Rapaport (RSA)
Mazin Al-Shukaili (OMA)

24 September 2026
17:00

Indonesia	1–12	Japan
Wibowo 20'	Report	Kimura 2'; Takade 4'; Ooka 5'; Fujishima 9', 11', 34'; Kawabe 15'; Matsumoto 23'; K. Tanaka 41'; T. Tanaka 51', 58'; Yamasaki 53'

Gifu Prefectural Green Stadium
Umpires:
Mazin Al-Shukaili (OMA)
You Hyo-sik (KOR)

26 September 2026
17:00

Japan	0–2	India
	Report	Abhishek 15'; Harmanpreet 40'

Gifu Prefectural Green Stadium
Umpires:
Lim Hong-Zhen (SGP)
Sean Rapaport (RSA)

28 September 2026
17:45

South Korea	3–2	Japan
Yang 29', 42'; Rim 52'	Report	Yamasaki 4'; Fujishima 60'

Gifu Prefectural Green Stadium
Umpires:
Rawi Anbananthan (MAS)
Haroon Rashid (PAK)

Fifth place Crossover

1 October 2026
11:30

Japan	9–1	Thailand
Fujishima 3', 29'; T. Tanaka 12', 17', 25', 41'; Kawabe 14', 52'; Yamasaki 22'	Report	Kuengsamrong 53'

Gifu Prefectural Green Stadium
Umpires:
Zhou Fuyi (CHN)
James Unkles (AUS)

Fifth place match

3 October 2026
14:00

Japan	5–0	China
Matsumoto 21'; Kawabe 21', 60'; Ooka 48'; Yamasaki 60'	Report

Gifu Prefectural Green Stadium
Umpires:
James Unkles (AUS)
You Hyo-sik (KOR)

=== Women's tournament ===
Team squads

The following is the Japan roster in the women's field hockey tournament of the 2026 Asian Games.

Head Coach: (Japan) Akira Takahashi

1. Akio Tanaka (GK)
2. Miyu Suzuki
3. Ikumi Matsu
4. Hanami Saito
5. Nanako Tateiwa
6. Emi Nishikori
7. Mayuri Horikawa
8. Shiho Kobayakawa
9. Mai Toriyama
10. Amiru Shimada
11. Akari Nakagomi
13. Hiroka Murayama
16. Saki Tanaka
17. Miyu Hasegawa
18. Yu Kudo (GK, C)
19. Maho Ueno
21. Rui Takashima
23. Maho Segawa
25. Haruka Kawaguchi
27. Nanami Kaneko

Preliminary round

Pos	Team	Pld	W	D	L	GF	GA	GD	Pts	Qualification
1	India	5	5	0	0	66	3	+63	15	Semi-finals
2	Japan (H)	5	4	0	1	23	4	+19	12	Semi-finals
3	Thailand	5	2	0	3	6	25	−19	6	Fifth place classification
4	Indonesia	5	2	0	3	6	27	−21	6	Fifth place classification
5	Singapore	5	1	0	4	4	18	−14	3	Ninth place game
6	Uzbekistan	5	1	0	4	5	33	−28	3	Eleventh place game

Source: FIH
Rules for classification: 1) points; 2) matches won; 3) goal difference; 4) goals for; 5) head-to-head result; 6) field goals for.
(H) Hosts

18 September 2026
17:00

Japan	7–0	Indonesia
Kobayakawa 26'; Murayama 32'; Shimada 40'; Ueno 45'; Saito 47'; Suzuki 50', 57'	Report

Gifu Prefectural Green Stadium
Umpires:
Kim Yoon-seon (KOR)
Rinky See (HKG)

21 September 2026
17:00

Japan	5–0	Singapore
Murayama 23'; Toriyama 28'; Kobayakawa 29'; Hasegawa 38'; Saito 44'	Report

Gifu Prefectural Green Stadium
Umpires:
Liu Yu-Chen (TPE)
Liu Xiaoying (CHN)

23 September 2026
17:00

Uzbekistan	1–7	Japan
Yubko 8'	Report	Kobayakawa 1', 38', 50'; Toriyama 15', 58'; Kawaguchi 20'; Suzuki 27'

Gifu Prefectural Green Stadium
Umpires:
Rama Potnis (IND)
Akalanka Ishan Kumara (SRI)

25 September 2026
11:00

Japan	1–3	India
Kobayakawa 46'	Report	Lalremsiami 5'; Ishika 30'; Navneet 36'

Gifu Prefectural Green Stadium
Umpires:
Kim Yoon-seon (KOR)
Valerie Koh (SGP)

27 September 2026
17:00

Thailand	0–3	Japan
	Report	Nakagomi 10', 23'; Saito 54'

Gifu Prefectural Green Stadium
Umpires:
Liu Yu-Chen (TPE)
Cookie Tan (SGP)

Semi-final

30 September 2026
16:30

China	0–0	Japan
	Report; SO Report
Penalties
Li (penalty shoot-out missed); Liu (penalty shoot-out scored); Ma (penalty shoot-out scored); Dan (penalty shoot-out scored); He (penalty shoot-out scored)	4–2	(penalty shoot-out scored) Murayama; (penalty shoot-out missed) Kobayakawa; (penalty shoot-out missed) Nakagomi; (penalty shoot-out scored) Hasegawa

Gifu Prefectural Green Stadium
Umpires:
Laurine Delforge (BEL)
Kim Yoon-seon (KOR)

Bronze medal match

2 October 2026
16:30

Japan	0–0	South Korea
	Report; SO Report
Penalties
Shimada (penalty shoot-out scored); Murayama (penalty shoot-out scored); Hasegawa (penalty shoot-out scored); Kobayakawa (penalty shoot-out scored)	4–2	(penalty shoot-out missed) Jung; (penalty shoot-out missed) Park Seu. (penalty shoot-out scored) An; (penalty shoot-out scored) L. Yu-jin

Gifu Prefectural Green Stadium
Umpires:
Liu Xiaoying (CHN)
Valerie Koh (SGP)

== Football ==
Summary

Team	Event	Group stage				Quarter-finals	Semi-finals	Final / BM	
Team	Event	Opposition Score	Opposition Score	Opposition Score	Rank	Opposition Score	Opposition Score	Opposition Score	Rank
Japan men's	Men's tournament	Hong Kong; W 2–0	Kyrgyzstan; W 7–0	Thailand; W 3–0	1	North Korea; W 1–0	Uzbekistan; W 1–1 (8–9)	South Korea; GM –	
Japan women's	Women's tournament	Thailand; W 8–0	Vietnam; W 8–0	Chinese Taipei; 4–0	1	Philippines; W 4–0	South Korea; W 2–0	North Korea; GM –	

=== Men's tournament ===
Team squads

Japan announced their final squad on 31 July.

Head coach: Gō Ōiwa

No.	Pos.	Player	Date of birth (age)	Club
1	GK	Alexandre Pisano	10 January 2006 (age 20)	(Japan Football Association) Nagoya Grampus
2	DF	Rei Umeki	25 August 2005 (age 21)	(Japan Football Association) Imabari
3	DF	Keita Kosugi	18 March 2006 (age 20)	(German Football Association) Eintracht Frankfurt
4	DF	Kaito Tsuchiya	12 May 2006 (age 20)	(Japan Football Association) Fukushima United
5	DF	Rion Ichihara	7 July 2005 (age 21)	(Royal Dutch Football Association) AZ Alkmaar
6	DF	Shuto Nagano	1 April 2006 (age 20)	(Japan Football Association) FC Tokyo
7	MF	Nelson Ishiwatari	10 May 2005 (age 21)	(Royal Belgian Football Association) Sint-Truidense
8	MF	Kenshin Yasuda	5 March 2005 (age 21)	(Japan Football Association) V-Varen Nagasaki
9	FW	Yutaka Michiwaki	5 April 2006 (age 20)	(Japan Football Association) Iwaki
10	MF	Hisatsugu Ishii	7 July 2005 (age 21)	(Japan Football Association) Shonan Bellmare
11	FW	Yumeki Yokoyama	23 September 2005 (age 21)	(Japan Football Association) Cerezo Osaka
12	GK	Masataka Kobayashi	20 September 2005 (age 21)	(Japan Football Association) Matsumoto Yamaga
13	FW	Shusuke Furuya	26 January 2005 (age 21)	(Japan Football Association) Tokyo International University
14	MF	Yuto Ozeki	6 February 2005 (age 21)	(Japan Football Association) Kawasaki Frontale
15	DF	Soichiro Mori	29 June 2007 (age 19)	(Japan Football Association) Nagoya Grampus
16	FW	Yuya Fukunaga	29 August 2005 (age 21)	(Japan Football Association) Kyoto Sangyo University
17	MF	Yotaro Nakajima	22 April 2006 (age 20)	(Japan Football Association) Sanfrecce Hiroshima
18	MF	Yudai Shimamoto	26 October 2006 (age 20)	(Japan Football Association) Shimizu S-Pulse
19	FW	Uche Brian Seo Nwadike	7 July 2005 (age 21)	(Danish Football Association) AaB
20	FW	Sena Ishibashi	22 April 2006 (age 20)	(Japan Football Association) Shonan Bellmare
21	DF	Mihiro Sato	26 February 2007 (age 19)	(Japan Football Association) Albirex Niigata
22	DF	Tariqkani Hayato Okabe	5 July 2006 (age 20)	(Japan Football Association) Toyo University
23	GK	Rui Araki	14 October 2007 (age 19)	(Japan Football Association) Gamba Osaka

Group play

Pos	Team	Pld	W	D	L	GF	GA	GD	Pts	Qualification
1	Japan (H)	3	3	0	0	12	0	+12	9	Advance to knockout stage
2	Thailand	3	2	0	1	8	6	+2	6	Advance to knockout stage
3	Kyrgyzstan	3	1	0	2	6	10	−4	3	
4	Hong Kong	3	0	0	3	1	11	−10	0	

Source: Aichi–Nagoya 26
Rules for classification: Group stage tiebreakers
(H) Hosts
16 September 2026
19:30

Japan	2–0	Hong Kong
Ishii 39'; Nagano 89'	Report

Toyota Stadium, Toyota
Attendance: 7,720
Referee: Tuan Yaasin (Malaysia)

20 September 2026
19:30

Kyrgyzstan	0–7	Japan
	Report	Yokoyama 28'; Nagano 36'; Ozeki 39'; Y. Nakajima 70' (pen.); Ishii 72'; Shimamoto 79', 86'

Toyota Stadium, Toyota
Attendance: 19,205
Referee: Payam Heydari (Iran)

23 September 2026
19:30

Japan	3–0	Thailand
Y. Nakajima 31'; Kosugi 47'; Ishii 48'	Report

Toyota Stadium, Toyota
Attendance: 18,408
Referee: Kim Woo-sung (South Korea)

Quarter-finals

26 September 2026
19:30

Japan	1–0	North Korea
Nwadike 39'	Report

Toyota Stadium, Toyota
Attendance: 18,912
Referee: Hanna Hattab (Syria)

Semifinals

30 September 2026
19:30

Uzbekistan	1–1 (a.e.t.)	Japan
Bakhromov 8'	Report	Ishibashi 88'
Penalties
Bakhromov (penalty scored); Tulkinbekov (penalty missed); Murtazaev (penalty scored); Reimov (penalty scored); Shodiboev (penalty scored); Rizakulov (penalty scored); Fayzullaev (penalty scored); Khamidov (penalty scored); Ibraimov (penalty scored); Khushvaktov (penalty missed)	8–9	(penalty scored) Nakajima; (penalty scored) Ozeki; (penalty scored) Ishiwatari; (penalty missed) Nwadike; (penalty scored) Tsuchiya; (penalty scored) Shimamoto; (penalty scored) Yokoyama; (penalty scored) Umeki; (penalty scored) Nagano; (penalty scored) Kosugi

Nagai Stadium, Osaka
Attendance: 15,550
Referee: Abdulhadi Al-Ruaile (Qatar)

Gold medal match

3 October 2026
19:30

(gold) South Korea	1–0	Japan (silver)
Eom Ji-sung 61'	Report

Toyota Stadium, Toyota
Attendance: 30,086
Referee: Adam Kersey (Australia)

=== Women's tournament ===
Team squads

The following players list is the Japan squad for the 2026 Asian Games.

Head Coach: Michihisa Kano (狩野 倫久)

No.	Pos.	Player	Date of birth (age)	Caps	Goals	Club
1	GK	Natsumi Asano (浅野 菜摘)	14 April 1997 (age 29)	1	0	(Japan Football Association) Chifure AS Elfen Saitama
12	GK	Shiori Fukuda (福田 史織)	13 June 2002 (age 24)	0	0	(Japan Football Association) Urawa Reds
23	GK	Shū Ohba (大場 朱羽)	11 July 2002 (age 24)	1	0	(Scottish Football Association) Rangers
2	DF	Sumire Suzuki (鈴木 菫)	24 January 2004 (age 22)	0	0	(Japan Football Association) JEF United Chiba
3	DF	Sakurako Ōhashi (大箸 桜子)	8 April 2004 (age 22)	0	0	(Japan Football Association) Toyo University
4	DF	Wakaba Gotō (後藤 若葉)	4 June 2001 (age 25)	0	0	(Japan Football Association) Urawa Reds
5	DF	Yūki Seno (瀬野 有希)	30 December 1996 (age 29)	0	0	(Japan Football Association) Chifure AS Elfen Saitama
13	DF	Ai Kuwahara (桑原 藍)	18 August 2004 (age 22)	0	0	(Japan Football Association) INAC Kobe Leonessa
19	DF	Fukina Mizuno (水野 蕗奈)	31 January 2001 (age 25)	0	0	(Japan Football Association) INAC Kobe Leonessa
6	MF	Fūna Yanase (柳瀬 楓菜)	6 June 2002 (age 24)	0	0	(Japan Football Association) Sanfrecce Hiroshima Regina
8	MF	Kotono Sakakibara (榊原 琴乃)	11 October 2004 (age 22)	0	0	(Japan Football Association) Urawa Reds
10	MF	Yui Narumiya (成宮 唯) (captain)	22 February 1995 (age 31)	14	5	(Japan Football Association) INAC Kobe Leonessa
14	MF	Yuzuho Shiokoshi (塩越 柚歩)	1 November 1997 (age 29)	8	2	(Japan Football Association) Tokyo Verdy Beleza
15	MF	Juri Ito (伊東 珠梨)	2 October 2002 (age 24)	2	0	(Japan Football Association) Nojima Stella Kanagawa Sagamihara
17	MF	Saori Takarada (宝田 沙織)	27 December 1999 (age 26)	24	1	(Japan Football Association) Cerezo Osaka
18	MF	Hikaru Yūmura (祐村 ひかる)	18 October 1997 (age 29)	0	0	(Japan Football Association) Nojima Stella Kanagawa Sagamihara
22	MF	Yoshino Nakashima (中嶋 淑乃)	27 July 1999 (age 27)	11	2	(Japan Football Association) Sanfrecce Hiroshima Regina
7	FW	Megu Hamada (浜田 芽来)	27 December 2000 (age 25)	1	0	(Japan Football Association) RB Omiya Ardija
9	FW	Mami Ueno (上野 真実)	27 September 1996 (age 30)	15	1	(Japan Football Association) Sanfrecce Hiroshima Regina
11	FW	Chiina Kamiya (神谷 千菜)	29 March 2001 (age 25)	0	0	(Japan Football Association) Sanfrecce Hiroshima Regina
16	FW	Nanasa Ikuta (生田 七彩)	14 September 2003 (age 23)	0	0	(Japan Football Association) Chifure AS Elfen Saitama
20	FW	Ai Tsujisawa (辻澤 亜唯)	17 December 2005 (age 20)	0	0	(Japan Football Association) INAC Kobe Leonessa
21	FW	Hanon Nishio (西尾 葉音)	27 April 2003 (age 23)	0	0	(Japan Football Association) RB Omiya Ardija

Group play

Pos	Team	Pld	W	D	L	GF	GA	GD	Pts	Qualification
1	Japan (H)	3	3	0	0	20	0	+20	9	Advance to knockout stage
2	Chinese Taipei	3	2	0	1	3	5	−2	6	Advance to knockout stage
3	Vietnam	3	0	1	2	1	10	−9	1	Advance to knockout stage
4	Thailand	3	0	1	2	0	9	−9	1	

Source: Aichi–Nagoya 26
Rules for classification: Group stage tiebreakers
(H) Hosts
14 September 2026
19:30

Japan	8–0	Thailand
Nakashima 3', 37', 41'; Kamiya 30'; Takarada 70', 74', 79'; Sakakibara 88'	Report

Shizuoka Stadium, Fukuroi
Attendance: 1,202
Referee: Nurul Ain Izatty Zainal (Malaysia)

17 September 2026
19:30

Vietnam	0–8	Japan
	Report	Kamiya 12', 52'; Shiokoshi 19'; Cù Thị Huỳnh Như 43' (o.g.); Hamada 45+3'; Nishio 78'; Narumiya 81'; Yumura 90+2'

Shizuoka Stadium, Fukuroi
Attendance: 1,029
Referee: Esraa Al-Mbaiden (Jordan)

21 September 2026
19:30

Japan	4–0	Chinese Taipei
Takarada 7' (pen.); Kamiya 20'; Ueno 51'; Ikuta 58'	Report

Shizuoka Stadium, Fukuroi
Attendance: 3,679
Referee: Khin Nyein Chan (Myanmar)

Quarter-finals

25 September 2026
19:30

Japan	4–0	Philippines
Takarada 2', 36'; Ueno 26'; Kamiya 45+2'	Report

Shizuoka Stadium, Fukuroi
Attendance: 1,084
Referee: Esraa Al-Mbaiden (Jordan)

Semifinals

29 September 2026
19:30

Japan	2–0	South Korea
Kamiya 54', 63'	Report

Shizuoka Stadium, Fukuroi
Attendance: 998
Referee: Lê Thị Ly (Vietnam)

Gold medal match

2 October 2026
19:30

(silver) North Korea	2–2 (a.e.t.)	Japan (gold)
Jong Kum 47'; Jon Ryong-jong 69'	Report	Ueno 32'; Nishio 86'
Penalties
Myong Yu-jong (penalty scored); Jon Ryong-jong (penalty scored); Jong Kum (penalty missed); Ri Hye-gyong (penalty scored)	3–5	(penalty scored) Takarada; (penalty scored) Mizuno; (penalty scored) Kuwahara; (penalty scored) Nishio; (penalty scored) Shiokoshi

Shizuoka Stadium, Fukuroi
Attendance: 6,243
Referee: Supiree Testhomya (Thailand)

== Handball ==
Summary

Team	Event	Group stage							Quarter-finals	Semi-finals	Final / BM	
Team	Event	Opposition Score	Opposition Score	Opposition Score	Opposition Score	Opposition Score	Opposition Score	Rank	Opposition Score	Opposition Score	Opposition Score	Rank
Japan men's	Men's tournament	China; W 31–27	Hong Kong; W 44–17	Qatar; L 28–37	—N/a			2 Q	Kuwait; W 37–32	Bahrain; W 31–35	Bronze medal match South Korea; W 37–32	3rd place, bronze medalist(s)
Japan women's	Women's tournament	Vietnam; W 40–14	Uzbekistan; W 43–12	Hong Kong; W 39–16	China; W 33–27	Kazakhstan; W 39–24	South Korea; L 23–27	—N/a				2nd place, silver medalist(s)

=== Men's tournament ===
Team rosters

- Takumi Nakamura (1)
- Kota Nakata (5)
- Taiga Tsutaya (7)
- Tomoya Sakurai (8)
- Daisuke Tanaka (14)
- Adam Yuki Baig (15)
- Soya Ichihara (18)
- Naoki Sugioka (19)
- Jin Watanabe (20)
- Yuta Iwashita (21)
- Tatsuki Yoshino (23)
- Hayato Goto (24)
- Hiroyasu Tamakawa (27)
- Naoki Fujisaka (30)
- Akio Hashimoto (32)
- Kotaro Mizumachi (38)

Group play

Pos	Team	Pld	W	D	L	GF	GA	GD	Pts	Qualification
1	Qatar	3	3	0	0	107	70	+37	6	Quarterfinals
2	Japan (H)	3	2	0	1	103	81	+22	4	Quarterfinals
3	China	3	1	0	2	90	87	+3	2	Quarterfinals
4	Hong Kong	3	0	0	3	60	122	−62	0	Quarterfinals

Source: asiangames2026.org
(H) Hosts

20 September 2026; 15:00	China	27–31	Japan	Toyoda Gosei Memorial Gymnasium; Referees: Al-Wahibi, Al-Shahi (OMA)
20 September 2026; 15:00	Sun, Xie 5	(12–16)	Sugioka 8	Toyoda Gosei Memorial Gymnasium; Referees: Al-Wahibi, Al-Shahi (OMA)
20 September 2026; 15:00	1× (yellow card) 6× (suspension)	Report	1× (yellow card) 2× (suspension)	Toyoda Gosei Memorial Gymnasium; Referees: Al-Wahibi, Al-Shahi (OMA)

21 September 2026; 12:00	Hong Kong	17–44	Japan	Toyoda Gosei Memorial Gymnasium; Referees: Gheisarian, Gheisarian (IRI)
21 September 2026; 12:00	Lin, Wong K. 4	(10–19)	Nakata 7	Toyoda Gosei Memorial Gymnasium; Referees: Gheisarian, Gheisarian (IRI)
21 September 2026; 12:00	2× (suspension)	Report	1× (suspension)	Toyoda Gosei Memorial Gymnasium; Referees: Gheisarian, Gheisarian (IRI)

25 September 2026; 15:30	Qatar	37–28	Japan	Kasugai City Gymnasium; Referees: Ismoilov, Ismoilov (UZB)
25 September 2026; 15:30	Marzo 9	(18–13)	Tsutaya, Yoshino 5	Kasugai City Gymnasium; Referees: Ismoilov, Ismoilov (UZB)
25 September 2026; 15:30	4× (suspension)	Report	2× (suspension) 1× (red card)	Kasugai City Gymnasium; Referees: Ismoilov, Ismoilov (UZB)

=== Women's tournament ===
Team rosters

- Miyako Hatsumi (3)
- Arisa Kinjo (5)
- Kaho Nakayama (13)
- Naoko Sahara (19)
- Kaoru Wada (21)
- Natsuki Aizawa (23)
- Asuka Fujita (27)
- Sakura Hauge (30)
- Haruno Sasaki (32)
- Minami Matsuura (37)
- Clare Gray (39)
- Yuki Yoshidome (51)
- Ai Nakao (65)
- Aki Ueshima (77)
- Kaede Higa (84)
- Sora Ishikawa (89)

Group play

Pos	Team	Pld	W	D	L	GF	GA	GD	Pts
1st place, gold medalist(s)	South Korea	6	6	0	0	243	105	+138	12
2nd place, silver medalist(s)	Japan (H)	6	5	0	1	217	120	+97	10
3rd place, bronze medalist(s)	China	6	4	0	2	189	154	+35	8
4	Kazakhstan	6	3	0	3	164	187	−23	6
5	Uzbekistan	6	2	0	4	116	206	−90	4
6	Hong Kong	6	1	0	5	131	209	−78	2
7	Vietnam	6	0	0	6	128	207	−79	0

Source: asiangames2026.org
(H) Hosts

19 September 2026; 12:00	Japan	40–14	Vietnam	Kasugai City Gymnasium; Referees: Allayarova, Razakbergenova (UZB)
19 September 2026; 12:00	Matsuura 10	(19–5)	Đàm 5	Kasugai City Gymnasium; Referees: Allayarova, Razakbergenova (UZB)
19 September 2026; 12:00	1× (suspension)	Report	1× (suspension)	Kasugai City Gymnasium; Referees: Allayarova, Razakbergenova (UZB)

20 September 2026; 17:30	Japan	43–12	Uzbekistan	Kasugai City Gymnasium; Referees: Lee, Lee (KOR)
20 September 2026; 17:30	Matsuura 10	(17–7)	Saparbaeva 5	Kasugai City Gymnasium; Referees: Lee, Lee (KOR)
20 September 2026; 17:30	2× (suspension)	Report	3× (suspension)	Kasugai City Gymnasium; Referees: Lee, Lee (KOR)

22 September 2026; 15:30	Hong Kong	16–39	Japan	Kasugai City Gymnasium; Referees: Razakbergenova, Allayarova (UZB)
22 September 2026; 15:30	Chong, Hung 4	(8–18)	Wada 7	Kasugai City Gymnasium; Referees: Razakbergenova, Allayarova (UZB)
22 September 2026; 15:30	1× (suspension)	Report	1× (suspension)	Kasugai City Gymnasium; Referees: Razakbergenova, Allayarova (UZB)

23 September 2026; 17:30	China	27–33	Japan	Kasugai City Gymnasium; Referees: Mohamed, Al-Aradi (BHR)
23 September 2026; 17:30	Liu C. 9	(16–18)	Aizawa 6	Kasugai City Gymnasium; Referees: Mohamed, Al-Aradi (BHR)
23 September 2026; 17:30	1× (yellow card) 3× (suspension)	Report	1× (suspension)	Kasugai City Gymnasium; Referees: Mohamed, Al-Aradi (BHR)

25 September 2026; 15:00	Kazakhstan	24–39	Japan	Toyoda Gosei Memorial Gymnasium; Referees: Mozafari, Mazaheri (IRI)
25 September 2026; 15:00	Abdikhamit 5	(12–15)	Aizawa 7	Toyoda Gosei Memorial Gymnasium; Referees: Mozafari, Mazaheri (IRI)
25 September 2026; 15:00	2× (suspension)	Report	2× (suspension)	Toyoda Gosei Memorial Gymnasium; Referees: Mozafari, Mazaheri (IRI)

27 September 2026; 18:00	Japan	23–27	South Korea	Toyoda Gosei Memorial Gymnasium; Referees: Al-Enezi, Al-Naseem (KUW)
27 September 2026; 18:00	Gray 6	(12–16)	Kwon 7	Toyoda Gosei Memorial Gymnasium; Referees: Al-Enezi, Al-Naseem (KUW)
27 September 2026; 18:00	1× (suspension)	Report	1× (yellow card) 5× (suspension) 1× (red card)	Toyoda Gosei Memorial Gymnasium; Referees: Al-Enezi, Al-Naseem (KUW)

== Karate ==
Men

Athlete	Event	Round of 32	Round of 16	Quarterfinals	Semifinals	Repechage	Final / BM	
Athlete	Event	Opposition Result	Opposition Result	Opposition Result	Opposition Result	Opposition Result	Opposition Result	Rank
Kakeru Nishiyama	Individual kata	—N/a	Edward (SRI); W 5–0	Setiabudi (INA); W 5–0	Al-Mosawi (KUW); W 4–1	—N/a	Fong MH (MAC); W 5–0	1st place, gold medalist(s)
Hiromu Hashimoto	–60 kg	Hamad (JOR); W 6–3	Mirzozoda (TJK); L 0–3	Did not advance				
Yugo Kozaki	–67 kg	Bye	Khuất (VIE); W 3–2	Al-Assiri (KSA); W 0–0	Shih C-c (TPE); W 5–2	—N/a	Rashidov (UZB); L 5–7	2nd place, silver medalist(s)

Women

Athlete	Event	Round of 16	Quarterfinals	Semifinals	Repechage	Final / BM	
Athlete	Event	Opposition Result	Opposition Result	Opposition Result	Opposition Result	Opposition Result	Rank
Maho Ono	Individual kata	Bùi (VIE); W 5–0	Choi H-e (KOR); W 5–0	Leong (SGP); W 5–0	—N/a	Lau (HKG); W 5–0	1st place, gold medalist(s)
Sarara Shimada	–61 kg	Gong L (CHN); L 2–6	Did not advance		Adnan (MAS); W 1–1	An J-e (KOR); W 9–2	3rd place, bronze medalist(s)
Tsubasa Kama	–68 kg	—N/a	Golshadnejad (IRI); W 3–0	Li Qq (CHN); L 4–7	—N/a	Nguyễn (VIE); L 4–4	5

== Modern pentathlon ==
Japan entered eight pentathletes to compete at the Games.

Individual

Athlete	Event	Fencing ranking round (épée one touch)		Semi-finals													Final												
Athlete	Event	Fencing ranking round (épée one touch)		Fencing		Obstacles			Swimming (100 m freestyle)			Laser-run (10 m laser pistol / 3000 m cross-country)			Total points	Final rank	Fencing		Obstacles			Swimming			Laser-run			Total points	Final rank
Athlete	Event	V–D	Rank	Rank	MP points	Time	Rank	MP points	Time	Rank	MP points	Time	Rank	MP points	Total points	Final rank	Rank	MP points	Time	Rank	MP points	Time	Rank	MP points	Time	Rank	MP points	Total points	Final rank
Taishu Sato	Men's	24–11	6	5	230	0:30.91	8	353	0:57.63	10	312	11:09.70	4	631	1526	4 Q	5	230	00:26.67	13	365	00:58.04	15	310	10:58.34	8	642	1547	11
Kazuaki Sekigawa	Men's	19–16	17	8	224	0:34.98	15	341	0:55.34	2	324	11:48.67	11	592	1481	12	Did not advance												
Kaoru Shinoki	Men's	17–18	21	11	214	0:27.73	11	362	0:57.78	9	312	11:39.15	8	601	1489	11	Did not advance												
Yousuke Tomita	Men's	20–15	12	6	228	0:47.63	17	303	0:56.49	6	318	10:54.20	7	646	1495	7 Q	12	212	00:28.04	15	361	00:56.17	7	320	10:32.77	5	668	1561	8
Ayumu Saito	Women's	25–7	1	2	244	0:36.16	6	337	1:07.08	10	265	13:12.70	7	508	1354	7 Q	3	238	0:30.94	8	353	1:05.90	15	271	12:57.26	14	523	1385	9
Yuri Suzuki	Women's	16–16	17	10	216	0:33.79	4	344	1:01.13	3	295	12:50.81	4	530	1385	2 Q	15	206	0:41.47	14	321	1:01.11	6	295	12:51.90	12	529	1351	13
Misaki Uchida	Women's	17–15	15	7	226	0:42.47	9	318	1:00.79	1	297	12:56.44	4	524	1365	3 Q	14	208	0:42.00	15	319	0:59.52	1	303	12:08.53	6	572	1402	6
Yuho Yano	Women's	14–18	21	4	236	0:47.03	11	304	1:00.69	2	297	12:32.77	1	548	1385	1 Q	18	196	0:53.27	17	286	1:00.13	2	300	11:40.75	1	600	1382	10

Team

Athlete	Event	Fencing	Obstacle	Swimming	Laser-run	Total	Rank
Yousuke Tomita; Taishu Sato; Kaoru Shinoki	Men	656	1088	942	1911	4597	4
Misaki Uchida; Ayumu Saito; Yuho Yano	Women	642	958	874	1695	4169	3rd place, bronze medalist(s)

== Sepak takraw ==
Athlete	Event	Group Stage				Semifinals	Final	
Athlete	Event	Opposition Score	Opposition Score	Opposition Score	Rank	Opposition Score	Opposition Score	Rank
Daishi Tamaki; Ikki Mito; Masaki Sasamoto; Shuma Takata; Toshitaka Naito; Yota Ichikawa	Men's regu	Thailand	Philippines	—N/a				
Ryota Haruhara; Yota Ichikawa; Hirokazu Kobayashi; Ikki Mito; Toshitaka Naito; Wataru Narawa; Masaki Sasamoto; Yuki Sato; Seiya Takano; Shuma Takata; Daishi Tamaki; Shun Yuasa	Men's team regu	Malaysia; L 0–3	India; W 2–1	Philippines; L 1–2	2 Q	Thailand; L 0–2	Did not advance	3rd place, bronze medalist(s)
Ryota Haruhara; Seiya Takano; Toshitaka Naito; Wataru Narawa; Yota Ichikawa; Yuki Sato	Men's quadrant	Indonesia	Singapore	South Korea				
Chinatsu Toriumi; Kayo Togami; Nagisa Makio	Women's doubles	Philippines	South Korea	India				
Shiori Harada; Aoba Taguchi; Patricia Nao Kawlu; Saki Hayashi; Minami Onda; Hinata Shiono; Chinatsu Izawa; Chinatsu Toriumi; Chinatsu Saegusa; Kayo Togami; Nagisa Makio; Yuumi Kiyosawa	Women's team regu	Thailand; L 0–3	South Korea; L 0–3	Indonesia; L 0–3	4 Q	Thailand; L 0–2	Indonesia; L 0–2	4
Chinatsu Izawa; Chinatsu Saegusa; Chinatsu Toriumi; Kayo Togami; Minami Onda; Nagisa Makio; Patricia Nao Kawlu	Women's quadrant	Indonesia	Malaysia	Laos				

== Shooting ==
=== Men ===
Individual

Athlete	Event	Qualification		Final	
Athlete	Event	Points	Rank	Points	Rank
Junnosuke Nakayama	10 m air pistol	577-14x	14	Did not advance	
Masaki Iwasa	10 m air pistol	577-21x	13	Did not advance	
Seiji Morikawa	10 m air pistol	576-19x	15	Did not advance	
Dai Yoshioka	25 m rapid fire pistol	570-13x	17	Did not advance	
Hibiki Takeuchi	25 m rapid fire pistol	570-14x	15	Did not advance	
Hiroki Iwata	25 m rapid fire pistol	566-10x	22	Did not advance	
Masaya Endoh	10 m air rifle	626.9	17	Did not advance	
Naoki Hanakawa	10 m air rifle	625.1	22	Did not advance	
Naoki Hanakawa	50 m rifle 3 position	582-24x	16	Did not advance	
Naoya Okada	10 m air rifle	628.1	12	Did not advance	
Naoya Okada	50 m rifle 3 position	585-26x	8 Q	313.8	6
Kento Koseki	50 m rifle 3 position	583-31x	11	Did not advance	
Hiroyuki Inoue	Trap	97	39	Did not advance	
Michihide Tamura	Trap	105	37	Did not advance	
Takuya Tamura	Trap	106	34	Did not advance	
Kazunari Maruyama	Skeet	106	37	Did not advance	
Shotaro Toguchi	Skeet	114	18	Did not advance	

Team

Athlete	Event	Final	
Athlete	Event	Points	Rank
Junnosuke Nakayama; Masaki Iwasa; Seiji Morikawa	10 m air pistol	1730-54x	3rd place, bronze medalist(s)
Dai Yoshioka; Hibiki Takeuchi; Hiroki Iwata	25 m rapid fire pistol	1706-37x	6
Masaya Endoh; Naoki Hanakawa; Naoya Okada	10 m air rifle	1880.1	6
Kento Koseki; Naoki Hanakawa; Naoya Okada	50 m rifle 3 position	1750-81x	4
Hiroyuki Inoue; Michihide Tamura; Takuya Tamura	Trap	308	10

=== Women ===
Individual

Athlete	Event	Qualification		Final	
Athlete	Event	Points	Rank	Points	Rank
Chizuru Sasaki	10 m air pistol	567-13x	31	Did not advance	
Chizuru Sasaki	25 m pistol	571-19x	24	Did not advance	
Hikaru Aizawa	10 m air pistol	567-10x	32	Did not advance	
Karon Nakagawa	10 m air pistol	572-12x	16	Did not advance	
Mika Zaitsu	25 m pistol	572-14x	21	Did not advance	
Satoko Yamada	25 m pistol	559-9x	41	Did not advance	
Hinata Taichi	10 m air rifle	633.8	4 Q	253.0 GR	1st place, gold medalist(s)
Hinata Taichi	50 m rifle 3 position	583-23x	21	Did not advance	
Misaki Nobata	10 m air rifle	632.6	9 Q	209.4	4
Misaki Nobata	50 m rifle 3 position	588-32x	5 Q	306.5	7
Shiori Hirata	10 m air rifle	630.7	10	Did not advance	
Ai Horinouchi	50 m rifle 3 position	583-23x	21	Did not advance	
Chiemi Kojima	Trap	105	17	Did not advance	
Nanami Miyasaka	Trap	105	18	Did not advance	
Riyo Kiyoshi	Trap	109	10	Did not advance	
Mirano Suzuki	Skeet	102	22	Did not advance	
Rika Kaiga	Skeet	109	13	Did not advance	
Yuka Kojima	Skeet	110	11	Did not advance	

Team

Athlete	Event	Final	
Athlete	Event	Points	Rank
Chizuru Sasaki; Hikaru Aizawa; Karon Nakagawa	10 m air pistol	1706-35x	7
Chizuru Sasaki; Mika Zaitsu; Satoko Yamada	25 m pistol	1702-42x	10
Hinata Taichi; Misaki Nobata; Shiori Hirata	10 m air rifle	1897.1	3rd place, bronze medalist(s)
Ai Horinouchi; Misaki Nobata; Shiori Hirata	50 m rifle 3 position	1766-95x	1st place, gold medalist(s)
Chiemi Kojima; Nanami Miyasaka; Riyo Kiyoshi	Trap	319	5
Mirano Suzuki; Rika Kaiga; Yuka Kojima	Skeet	321	5

=== Mixed ===
Team

Athlete	Event	Qualification		Final	
Athlete	Event	Points	Rank	Points	Rank
Hikaru Aizawa; Seiji Morikawa	10 m air pistol	589-20x	12	Did not advance	
Misaki Nobata; Naoki Hanakawa	10 m air rifle	631.4	4 Q	439.7	3rd place, bronze medalist(s)
Michihide Tamura; Nanami Miyasaka	Trap	133	8	Did not advance	
Shotaro Toguchi; Yuka Kojima	Skeet	132	7	Did not advance	

== Soft tennis ==
Men

Athlete	Event	Group stage				Quarter-finals	Semi-finals	Final / BM	
Athlete	Event	Opposition Score	Opposition Score	Opposition Score	Rank	Opposition Score	Opposition Score	Opposition Score	Rank
Takuya Kurosaka	Singles	Bataa (MGL); W 4–1	Keavirak (CAM); W 4–0	Kim (KOR); W 4–3	1 Q	Chang (TPE); W 4–2	Meena (IND); W 4–2	Uematsu (JPN); L 3–4	2nd place, silver medalist(s)
Toshiki Uematsu	Singles	Doeum (CAM); W 4–0	Hutauruk (INA); W 4–2	Ali (PAK); W 4–0	1 Q	Bye	Chen (TPE); W 4–2	Kurosaka (JPN); W 4–3	1st place, gold medalist(s)
Kaito Maruyama; Sara Hirooka; Takafumi Uchimoto; Takuya Kurosaka; Toshiki Uematsu	Team	Cambodia; W 3–0	Philippines; W 3–0	Pakistan; W 3–0	1 Q	Bye	Indonesia; W 2–0	Chinese Taipei; W 2–0	1st place, gold medalist(s)

Women

Athlete	Event	Group stage				Quarter-finals	Semi-finals	Final / BM	
Athlete	Event	Opposition Score	Opposition Score	Opposition Score	Rank	Opposition Score	Opposition Score	Opposition Score	Rank
Kiho Miyamae	Singles	Zaidi (PAK); W 4–0	Sanosa (PHI); W 4–1	—N/a	1 Q	Chiang (TPE); W 4–2	Ri J-m (PRK); L 0–4	Did not advance	3rd place, bronze medalist(s)
Rena Temma	Singles	Chaudhary (NEP); W 4–0	Erdenbileg (MGL); W 4–0	—N/a	1 Q	Lee (KOR); W 4–2	Ri S-h (PRK); W 4–0	Ri J-m (PRK); W 4–3	1st place, gold medalist(s)
Ayaka Iwakura; Kiho Miyamae; Rio Maeda; Rena Temma; Sakura Nakatani	Team	Cambodia; W 3–0	Pakistan; W 3–0	South Korea; W 3–0	1 Q	—N/a	Philippines; W 2–0	Chinese Taipei; W 2–1	1st place, gold medalist(s)

Mixed

Athlete	Event	Group stage				Second Stage	Quarter-finals	Semi-finals	Final / BM	
Athlete	Event	Opposition Score	Opposition Score	Opposition Score	Rank	Opposition Score	Opposition Score	Opposition Score	Opposition Score	Rank
Kaito Maruyama; Rio Maeda	Doubles	Kan / Yean (CAM); W 5–0	Hacnolath / Simmalavong (LAO); W 5–1	Sanger / Arasy (INA); W 5–0	1 Q	Laluyan / Nafiiah (INA); W 5–0	Kim H-s/ Lee S-j (KOR); W 5–1	Yu / Huang (TPE); L 0–5	Did not advance	3rd place, bronze medalist(s)
Rena Temma; Toshiki Uematsu	Doubles	Sanosa / Nuguit (PHI); W 5–0	—N/a		1 Q	—N/a	Sanger / Arasy (INA); W 5–2	Kim / Park (KOR); W 5–1	Yu / Huang (TPE); L 4–5	2nd place, silver medalist(s)

== Surfing ==
Athlete	Event	Round 1		Round 2	Round 3	Quarter-finals	Semi-finals	Final / BM	
Athlete	Event	Score	Rank	Opposition Result	Opposition Result	Opposition Result	Opposition Result	Opposition Result	Rank
Kanoa Igarashi	Men's shortboard	11.77	2 R3	Bye	Karasawa (JPN); W 15.67–15.26	Meydi (INA); W 14.00–11.33	Espejon (PHI); W 18.33–5.83	Ariyana (INA); W 12.87–10.42	1st place, gold medalist(s)
Connor Karasawa	Men's shortboard	13.90	1 R3	Bye	Igarashi (JPN); L 15.26–15.67	Did not advance			
Mirai Ikeda	Women's shortboard	10.93	1 R3	Bye	Abdul Rashid (MAS); W 18.53–2.37	Flyn (THA); W 10.67–5.43	Studer (INA); W 10.83–8.17	Yang (CHN); W 11.64–7.57	1st place, gold medalist(s)
Minami Nonaka	Women's shortboard	12.67	1 R3	Bye	Gayen (IND); W 14.60–5.17	Heuer (INA); W 8.10–6.97	Yang (CHN); L 8.84–13.83	Studer (INA); W 9.06–7.10	3rd place, bronze medalist(s)

Qualification legend: R3 - Qualifies to elimination rounds; R2 - Qualifies to repechage round

== Table tennis ==
Men

Athlete	Event	Round of 32	Round of 16	Quarterfinal	Semifinal	Final / BM	
Athlete	Event	Opposition Result	Opposition Result	Opposition Result	Opposition Result	Opposition Result	Rank
Sora Matsushima	Singles	Ankhbayar (MGL); W 4–0	Quek (SGP); W 4–2	Lin (CHN); L 2–4	Did not advance		
Tomokazu Harimoto	Singles	Ahussein (QAT); W 4–0	Kurmangaliyev (KAZ); W 4–0	Alamian (IRI); L 3–4	Did not advance		
Hiroto Shinozuka; Tomokazu Harimoto	Doubles	Shah / Thakkar (IND); W 3–1	Hung / Hsu (TPE); W 3–1	Pang / Quek (SGP); W 3–0	Xiang / Wen (CHN); W 4–3	Lin / Huang (CHN); L 2–4	2nd place, silver medalist(s)
Shunsuke Togami; Sora Matsushima	Doubles	Maharjan / Kapali (NEP); W 3–0	Gnanasekaran / Desai (IND); W 3–0	Oh / Lim (KOR); W 3–1	Lin / Huang (CHN); L 1–4	Did not advance	3rd place, bronze medalist(s)

Women

Athlete	Event	Round of 32	Round of 16	Quarterfinal	Semifinal	Final / BM	
Athlete	Event	Opposition Result	Opposition Result	Opposition Result	Opposition Result	Opposition Result	Rank
Miwa Harimoto	Singles	Sawettabut (THA); W 4–0	Ghorpade (IND); W 4–1	Kim (PRK); W 4–1	Wang (CHN); L 1–4	Did not advance	3rd place, bronze medalist(s)
Hina Hayata	Singles	Iloukhani (IRI); W 4–0	So (HKG); W 4–1	Zhu (MAC); W 4–0	Sun (CHN); L 1–4	Did not advance	3rd place, bronze medalist(s)
Miwa Harimoto; Hina Hayata	Doubles	Vijitviriyagul / Wonglakhon (THA); W 3–0	Wu / Chen (TPE); W 3–0	Chen / Fan (CHN); W 3–0	Doo / Ng (HKG); W 4–0	Kuai / Wang (CHN); L 0–4	2nd place, silver medalist(s)
Miyu Nagasaki; Rin Mende	Doubles	Ali / Mohamed (QAT); W 3–0	Su T. T. / Lee H. M. (HKG); W 3–0	Kuai / Wang (CHN); W 0–3	Did not advance		

Mixed

Athlete	Event	Round of 64	Round of 32	Round of 16	Quarterfinal	Semifinal	Final / BM	
Athlete	Event	Opposition Result	Opposition Result	Opposition Result	Opposition Result	Opposition Result	Opposition Result	Rank
Hiroto Shinozuka; Mima Ito	Doubles	Dilshodov / Erkebaeva (UZB); W 3–0	Pang / Zeng (SGP); W 3–0	Lin Y-j / Cheng I-c (TPE); L 0–3	Did not advance			
Miwa Harimoto; Sora Matsushima	Doubles	Bye	U T-r / Pyon S-g (PRK); W 3–2	Oh J-s / Kim N-y (PRK); W 3–2	Sun / Wang (CHN); L 0–3	Did not advance		

Team

Athlete	Event	Group stage			Quarterfinal	Semifinal	Final	
Athlete	Event	Opposition Score	Opposition Score	Rank	Opposition Score	Opposition Score	Opposition Score	Rank
Hiroto Shinozuka; Shunsuke Togami; Sora Matsushima; Tomokazu Harimoto; Yukiya Uda	Men's	Maldives; W 3–0	Uzbekistan; W 3–0	1 Q	Kazakhstan; W 3–0	South Korea; W 3–0	China; W 3–2	1st place, gold medalist(s)
Hina Hayata; Mima Ito; Miwa Harimoto; Miyu Nagasaki; Rin Mende	Women's	Mongolia; W 3–0	Uzbekistan; W 3–0	1 Q	Chinese Taipei; W 3–0	South Korea; W 3–0	China; L 0–3	2nd place, silver medalist(s)

== Teqball ==
Singles

Athlete	Event	Group stage						Quarter-finals	Semi-finals / R	Final / BM	
Athlete	Event	Opposition Score	Opposition Score	Opposition Score	Opposition Score	Opposition Score	Rank	Opposition Score	Opposition Score	Opposition Score	Rank
Akinori Wase	Men	Agustin (PHI); W 12–4, 12–8	Bá (VIE); W 11–12, 12–10, 12–8	Alisa (LAO); W 12–2, 12–3	Putra (INA); L 12–6, 9–12, 13–15	Lee J-s (KOR); L 5–12, 9–12	3 Q	Eidan (KUW); L 6–12, 9–12	Putra (INA); L 3–12, 11–12	Did not advance	
Yuina Sakamoto	Women	Dy (CAM); W 12–5, 12–6	Dsouza (IND); L 12–10, 11–12, 11–13	—N/a			2 Q	Dandal (LBN); L 9–12, 7–12	—N/a	Dsouza (IND); W 12–11, 12–11	3rd place, bronze medalist(s)

Doubles

Team	Event	Group stage						Quarter-finals	Semi-finals / R	Final / BM	
Team	Event	Opposition Score	Opposition Score	Opposition Score	Opposition Score	Opposition Score	Rank	Opposition Score	Opposition Score	Opposition Score	Rank
Takahiro Nodomi; Seiya Arai	Men	Ahmad / Al-Qattan (KUW); L 12–10, 9–12, 5–12	Nominchimeg / Ganzorig (MGL); W 12–1, 12–0	—N/a			2 Q	Thaosiri / Chanliang (LBN); L 2–12, 8–12	Uba / Mardan (INA); L 4–12, 7–12	Did not advance	
Yuina Sakamoto; Akinori Wase	Mixed	Nguyễn / Trịnh (VIE); L 11–12, 7–12	Aidarbekov / Otorbaeva (KGZ); W 5–12, 8–12	Kim Eun-j / Jang E-s (KOR); W 12–10, 10–12, 12–7	Radhi / Abed (IRQ); L 10–12, 11–12	Inthalapheth / Phonexay (LAO); W 12–6, 12–5	3 Q	Bun / Yorn (CAM); W 12–9, 12–11	Radhi / Abed (IRQ); W 10–12, 12–10, 12–9	Dejaroen / Wongkhamchan (THA); L 4–12, 5–12	2nd place, silver medalist(s)

== Triathlon ==
Individual

Athlete	Event	Time						Rank
Athlete	Event	Swim (0.75 km)	Trans 1	Bike (20 km)	Trans 2	Run (5 km)	Total	Rank
Aoba Yasumatsu	Men	8:57	0:35	28:17	0:14	16:08	54:11	8
Takumi Hojo	Men	8:55	0:35	28:20	0:15	14:51	52:56	1st place, gold medalist(s)
Mako Hiraizumi	Women	9:59	0:37	30:08	0:17	18:00	59:01	5
Manami Hayashi	Women	9:52	0:42	30:11	0:16	17:35	58:36	3rd place, bronze medalist(s)

Relay

Athlete	Event	Time						Rank
Athlete	Event	Swim (300 m)	Trans 1	Bike (6.6 km)	Trans 2	Run (1 km)	Total	Rank
Mako Hiraizumi	Mixed	4:24	0:46	10:20	0:21	6:59	22:50	—N/a
Kazushi Jozuka	Mixed	4:00	0:40	9:28	0:18	6:07	20:33	—N/a
Manami Hayashi	Mixed	4:23	1:01	9:32	0:25	5:02	20:23	—N/a
Takumi Hojo	Mixed	3:53	0:44	9:42	0:19	6:02	20:40	—N/a
Total	Mixed	—N/a					1:26:45	2nd place, silver medalist(s)

== Volleyball ==
Both the men's and women's national volleyball teams of Japan have qualified for the indoor volleyball tournaments of the 2026 Asian Games. They earned their place via FIVB rankings.

=== Beach ===
Athletes	Event	Preliminary round				Round of 16	Quarter-finals	Semi-finals	Final / BM	
Athletes	Event	Opposition Score	Opposition Score	Opposition Score	Rank	Opposition Score	Opposition Score	Opposition Score	Opposition Score	Rank
Juntaro Tachiya; Yusuke Ishijima	Men's	Abdulmajid / Yakovlev (KAZ); W 2–1 (22–20, 19–21, 15–12)	Song JY / Wang YW (CHN); L 0–2 (15–21, 18–21)	Dauilbaev / Tolibaev (UZB); W 2–0 (21–17, 21–17)	2 Q	Pourasgari / Aghajanighasab (IRI); L 1–2 (21–18, 17–21, 8–15)	Did not advance			
Kota Kurosawa; Taito Mizumachi	Men's	Shaikat / Ahmed (BAN); W 2–0 (21–11, 21–15)	Adam / Ismail (MDV); W 2–0 (21–15, 21–11)	Khakizadeh / Ghalehnovi (IRI); W 2–1 (21–17, 19–21, 15–12)	1 Q	Nguyen / Le (VIE); W 2–0 (21–12, 21–16)	Wu / Zhou (CHN); W 2–1 (19–21, 21–13, 15–13)	Efendi / Akbar (INA); L 0–2 (19–21, 18–21)	Taovato / Tipjan (THA); W 2–1 (21–18, 17–21, 15–12)	3rd place, bronze medalist(s)
Mayu Sawame; Sakura Ito	Women's	Bahmanzadeh / Ashraf Abuissa (QAT); W 2–0 (21–7, 21–3)	Karimova / Ryukhova (KAZ); W 2–0 (21–12, 21–7)	—N/a	1 Q	Pons / Rondina (PHI); L 0–2 (17–21, 15–21)	Did not advance			
Non Matsumoto; Ren Matsumoto	Women's	Purevjargal / Erdenesukh (MGL); W 2–0 (21–6, 21–7)	Nguyễn / Châu (VIE); W 2–1 (21–13, 21–23, 15–12)	—N/a	1 Q	Kudaikulova / Rasulbek Kyzy (KGZ); W 2–0 (21–10, 21–12)	Progella / Pagara (PHI); L 0–2 (22–24, 20–22)	Did not advance		

=== Indoor ===
Summary

Team	Event	Group stage				Quarter-finals	Semi-finals	Final / BM	
Team	Event	Opposition Score	Opposition Score	Opposition Score	Rank	Opposition Score	Opposition Score	Opposition Score	Rank
Japan men's	Men's tournament	Uzbekistan; W 3–0	Kazakhstan; W 3–0	Pakistan; W 3–0	1 Q	Qatar; W 3–0	China; W 3–2	Iran; L 1–3	2nd place, silver medalist(s)
Japan women's	Women's tournament	Nepal; W 3–0	Indonesia; W 3–1	—N/a	1 Q	Chinese Taipei; W 3–0	South Korea; W 3–0	China; L 0–3	2nd place, silver medalist(s)

==== Men's tournament ====
Team roster

- Tatsunori Otsuka
- Yudai Arai
- Yudai Kawahigashi
- Masato Kai
- Keigo Nishimoto
- Hiroto Nishiyama
- Keihan Takahashi
- Ryo Shimokawa
- Rikuto Goto
- Kento Asano
- Keitaro Nishikawa
- Kazuyuki Takahashi

Group play

Pos	Team	Pld	W	L	Pts	SW	SL	SR	SPW	SPL	SPR	Qualification
1	Japan (H)	3	3	0	9	9	0	MAX	229	173	1.324	Quarterfinals
2	Pakistan	3	2	1	6	6	4	1.500	236	218	1.083	Quarterfinals
3	Kazakhstan	3	1	2	3	4	7	0.571	221	253	0.874	Classification 9th–16th
4	Uzbekistan	3	0	3	0	1	9	0.111	196	238	0.824	Classification 9th–16th

Source: asiangames2026.org
Rules for classification: Tiebreakers
(H) Host

==== Women's tournament ====
Team roster

- Yukiko Wada
- Yoshino Sato
- Nanami Seki
- Nichika Yamada
- Maki Yamaguchi
- Hitomi Shiode
- Hinata Shigihara
- Mana Nishizaki
- Ai Hirota
- Ayane Kitamado
- Miina Inoue
- Miku Akimoto

Group play

Pos	Team	Pld	W	L	Pts	SW	SL	SR	SPW	SPL	SPR	Qualification
1	Japan (H)	2	2	0	6	6	1	6.000	173	111	1.559	Quarterfinals
2	Indonesia	2	1	1	3	4	3	1.333	155	151	1.026	Quarterfinals
3	Nepal	2	0	2	0	0	6	0.000	84	150	0.560	Classification 9th–14th

Source: asiangames2026.org
Rules for classification: Tiebreakers
(H) Host

== Wrestling ==
Japan entered twelve male and six female wrestlers.

Key:

- VT (ranking points: 5–0 or 0–5) – Victory by fall.
- VB (ranking points: 5–0 or 0–5) – Victory by injury (VF for forfeit, VA for withdrawal or disqualification)
- PP (ranking points: 3–1 or 1–3) – Decision by points – the loser with technical points.
- PO (ranking points: 3–0 or 0–3) – Decision by points – the loser without technical points.
- ST (ranking points: 4–0 or 0–4) – Great superiority – the loser without technical points and a margin of victory of at least 8 (Greco-Roman) or 10 (freestyle) points.
- SP (ranking points: 4–1 or 1–4) – Technical superiority – the loser with technical points and a margin of victory of at least 8 (Greco-Roman) or 10 (freestyle) points.

Freestyle

Athlete	Event	Round of 32	Round of 16	Quarter-finals	Semi-finals	Repechage	Final / BM	
Athlete	Event	Opposition Result	Opposition Result	Opposition Result	Opposition Result	Opposition Result	Opposition Result	Rank
Yamato Ogawa	Men's –57 kg							
Kotaro Kiyooka	Men's –65 kg							
Yoshinosuke Aoyagi	Men's –74 kg							
Hayato Ishiguro	Men's –86 kg							
Arash Yoshida	Men's –97 kg							
Taiki Yamamoto	Men's –125 kg							
Yui Susaki	Women's –50 kg							
Moe Kiyooka	Women's –53 kg							
Akari Fujinami	Women's –57 kg							
Nonoka Ozaki	Women's –62 kg							
Ami Ishii	Women's –68 kg							
Yuka Kagami	Women's –76 kg							

Greco-Roman

Athlete	Event	Round of 16	Quarter-finals	Semi-finals	Repechage	Final / BM	
Athlete	Event	Opposition Result	Opposition Result	Opposition Result	Opposition Result	Opposition Result	Rank
Ayata Suzuki	Men's −60 kg						
Kyotaro Sogabe	Men's −67 kg						
Nao Kusaka	Men's −77 kg						
Taizo Yoshida	Men's −87 kg						
Yuri Nakazato	Men's −97 kg						
Yuta Nara	Men's −130 kg						

== Wushu ==
=== Taolu ===
Men

Athlete	Event	Event 1		Event 2		Total	Rank
Athlete	Event	Result	Rank	Result	Rank	Total	Rank
Kohtarou Higashi	Changquan	9.693	9	—N/a		9.693	9
Maho Imai	Daoshu & gunshu						
Tomohiro Araya	Taijiquan & taijijian	9.703	8	9.723	3	19.426	4

Women

Athlete	Event	Event 1		Event 2		Total	Rank
Athlete	Event	Result	Rank	Result	Rank	Total	Rank
Kana Ikeuchi	Changquan	9.440	16	—N/a		9.440	16
Runa Kuge	Changquan	9.700	6	—N/a		9.700	6
Nanoha Kida	Jianshu & qiangshu						
Shiho Saito	Taijiquan & taijijian	9.733	2	9.740	2	19.473	2nd place, silver medalist(s)

== See also ==
- Japan at the 2026 Asian Para Games
