= Sailing at the 2026 Asian Games – Girls' 29er =

Girls' 29er at the 2026 Asian Games
- Venue: Kaiyoh Yacht Harbor
- Date: 26 September – 2 October 2026
- Competitors: 8 from 4 nations

Medalists
gold medal	Chloe Kong; McCarley Wong	Hong Kong
silver medal	Natsumi Funazawa; Natsuko Funazawa	Japan
bronze medal	Nor Izniey Humaira Mohd Azri; Aina Zulakhia Azizul Rahman	Malaysia

The girls' 29er competition at the 2026 Asian Games was held from 26 September – 2 October 2026 at Kaiyoh Yacht Harbor in Gamagōri, Aichi, Japan.

Chloe Kong and McCarley Wong won the gold medal, Natsumi Funazawa and Natsuko Funazawa took silver and Nor Izniey Humaira Mohd Azri and Aina Zulakhia Azizul Rahman bronze.

== Schedule ==
All times are Japan Standard Time (UTC+09:00).

Date	Time	Event
Saturday, 26 September 2026	11:10	Race 1–2
Wednesday, 30 September 2026	14:05	Race 3–4
Thursday, 1 October 2026	13:05	Race 5–8
Friday, 2 October 2026	10:05	Race 9–12

== Results ==
Legend

- DNF — Did not finish
- DNS — Did not start

Rank	Team	Race												Total	Net
Rank	Team	1	2	3	4	5	6	7	8	9	10	11	12	Total	Net
1st place, gold medalist(s)	Hong Kong (HKG); Chloe Kong; McCarley Wong	~~(3)~~	1	~~(3)~~	2	1	1	1	1	1	1	1	1	17	11
2nd place, silver medalist(s)	Japan (JPN); Natsumi Funazawa; Natsuko Funazawa	1	~~(4)~~	~~(2)~~	1	2	2	2	2	2	2	2	2	24	18
3rd place, bronze medalist(s)	Malaysia (MAS); Nor Izniey Humaira Mohd Azri; Aina Zulakhia Azizul Rahman	2	2	1	3	3	4	4	3	3	4	~~(5)~~; DNF	~~(5)~~; DNF	39	29
4	Thailand (THA); Patcharaphan Ongkaloy; Pichayapa Kamutatira	4	3	4	4	4	3	3	4	4	3	~~(5)~~; DNF	~~(5)~~; DNS	46	36
