= Toyoshige Kano =

Japanese basketball player (born 2001)

No. 14 – Sun Rockers Shibuya
- Position: Center
- League: B.League

Personal information
- Born: 6 October 2001 (age 25) Tokyo, Japan
- Listed height: 210 cm (6 ft 11 in)
- Listed weight: 105 kg (231 lb)

Career information
- College: Skyline College
- Playing career: 2023–present
Medals
Men's basketball
Representing Japan
Asian Games
Silver medal – second place	2026 Aichi-Nagoya	Men's tournament

Toyoshige Kano (Japanese: 狩野 富成; born 6 October 2001) is a Japanese professional basketball player for Sun Rockers Shibuya of the B.League. He plays as a center and has represented Japan internationally, including at the 2025 FIBA Asia Cup and the 2026 Asian Games, where he won a silver medal.

== Early life and education ==
Kano was born in Tokyo, Japan. He attended Skyline College in California, where he played college basketball before beginning his professional career in Japan.

== Professional career ==
Kano began his professional career with the Shinshu Brave Warriors in the B.League during the 2024–25 season after previously playing for Tokushima Gambarous on loan during the 2023–24 season. He played for Shinshu during the 2024–25 season before joining Sun Rockers Shibuya.

Kano joined Sun Rockers Shibuya in 2025 and continued with the club after its transition to B.PREMIER for the 2026–27 season. He plays primarily as a center and is known for his ability to finish around the basket.

== International career ==
Kano made his senior international debut for Japan at the 2025 FIBA Asia Cup. He appeared in four games, averaging 1.0 point and 0.3 rebounds per game.

In 2026, Kano was selected for Japan's men's basketball team for the 2026 Asian Games in Aichi-Nagoya. He was listed as a 210 cm center for Sun Rockers Shibuya. Japan advanced to the men's gold-medal game against South Korea. Kano contributed two points, one rebound and two blocks in the final as Japan finished with the silver medal.
