= Ai Kuwahara =

Japanese footballer

Personal information
- Date of birth: 18 August 2004
- Place of birth: Hiroshima Prefecture, Japan
- Height: 1.67 m (5 ft 6 in)
- Positions: Forward; midfielder

Team information
- Current team: INAC Kobe Leonessa

Youth career
- FC LIDER
- Seagull Hiroshima Ladies
- AICJ High School

Senior career*
| Years | Team | Apps | (Gls) |
| 2023– | INAC Kobe Leonessa | | |

International career
| 2026– | Japan | | |
Medal record
Representing Japan
Asian Games
| Gold medal – first place | 2026 Aichi-Nagoya | Women's football |
- * Club domestic league appearances and goals

Ai Kuwahara (Japanese: 桑原 藍, born 18 August 2004) is a Japanese professional footballer who plays as a forward or midfielder for INAC Kobe Leonessa in the WE League. She has represented the Japan national team and was part of the squad that won the women's football gold medal at the 2026 Asian Games.

== Career ==
Kuwahara was born in Hiroshima Prefecture, Japan. She played youth football for FC LIDER and Seagull Hiroshima Ladies before attending AICJ High School. In December 2022, INAC Kobe Leonessa announced that she would join the club for the 2023–24 season.

Kuwahara plays primarily as a forward and can also operate in midfield. She was selected for the Japan senior women's national team squad for the women's football tournament at the 2026 Asian Games, receiving her first call-up to the national team.

At the 2026 Asian Games in Aichi-Nagoya, Kuwahara featured in Japan's defensive line during the knockout stages. Japan defeated South Korea 2–0 in the semi-final before facing North Korea in the final on 2 October 2026. After a 2–2 draw following extra time, Japan won the penalty shoot-out 5–3 to claim its third consecutive Asian Games gold medal. Kuwahara was part of the gold-medal-winning squad.
