= Daisuke Yoshimoto =

Japanese basketball coach (born 1981)

Philadelphia 76ers
- Positions: Assistant coach; Head video coordinator
- League: NBA

Personal information
- Born: May 23, 1981 (age 45) Higashiosaka, Osaka, Japan

Career information
- High school: Daishou (Toyonaka, Osaka)
- College: Fordham University

Career history

Coaching
- 2020–2025: New York Knicks (assistant)
- 2025–2026: Grand Rapids Gold (assistant)
- 2026–present: Philadelphia 76ers (assistant)

Daisuke "Dice" Yoshimoto (吉本 泰輔, Yoshimoto Daisuke; born May 23, 1981) is a Japanese professional basketball coach who is an assistant coach for the Philadelphia 76ers of the NBA and the Japanese national team.

== Coaching Career ==
=== Early Coaching Career ===
Yoshimoto began his career as an intern video coordinator with the New Jersey Nets in 2009. In 2011, he served as video coordinator for the Ukraine men's national basketball team, later joining the Chicago Bulls staff under coach Tom Thibodeau in the same position. Yoshimoto continued as video coordinator for the Bulls until the 2015–2016 NBA Season, when he joined the Denver Nuggets organization. From 2016–19, he continued working under Thibodeau with the Minnesota Timberwolves as Special Assistant to Head of Basketball Operations and Player Development Coach.

In 2019, he served as Director of Basketball Strategy and Video at the University of Georgia.

=== New York Knicks (2020–2025) ===
In 2020, Yoshimoto reunited with Thibodeau, joining the staff of the New York Knicks as assistant to head coach. From 2022–25, he served as an Assistant Coach for the Knicks, as well as serving as the Head Coach of the Knicks Summer League team from 2021–24.

=== Grand Rapids Gold (2025–2026) ===
Yoshimoto served as an Assistant Coach for the Grand Rapids Gold during the 2025–26 NBA G League season.

=== Philadelphia 76ers (2026–present) ===
In August of 2026, the 76ers released their coaching staff for the 2026–27 season, with the addition of Yoshimoto as an Assistant Coach and Head Video Coordinator.

=== Japanese National Team (2026–present) ===
In February 2026, the Japan Basketball Association announced a complete restructuring of the national team's coaching staff, with Dai Oketani replacing Tom Hovasse as head coach and Yoshimoto joining as an assistant coach.
