= Kazuma Tsuya =

Japanese basketball player (born 1998)

No. 28 – San-en NeoPhoenix
- Position: Shooting guard
- League: B.League

Personal information
- Born: 7 June 1998 (age 28) Aomori Prefecture, Japan
- Listed height: 191 cm (6 ft 3 in)
- Listed weight: 90 kg (198 lb)

Career information
- College: Tokai University
- Playing career: 2020–present
Medals
Men's basketball
Representing Japan
Asian Games
| Silver medal – second place | 2026 Aichi-Nagoya | Men's tournament |

Kazuma Tsuya (Japanese: 津屋 一球; born 7 June 1998) is a Japanese professional basketball player for San-en NeoPhoenix of the B.League. He plays as a shooting guard and has represented Japan at youth and senior international level. Tsuya won a silver medal with Japan in the men's tournament at the 2026 Asian Games.

== Early life and education ==
Tsuya was born in Aomori Prefecture, Japan, and attended Tokai University. He developed as a shooting guard and began his professional career with San-en NeoPhoenix.

== Professional career ==
Tsuya began his professional career with San-en NeoPhoenix during the 2020–21 season. He remained with the club through the 2021–22 season before joining Sun Rockers Shibuya for the 2022–23 and 2023–24 seasons. He returned to San-en NeoPhoenix in 2024 and has continued with the club since then.

In the B.League, Tsuya has primarily played as a shooting guard and has been noted for his three-point shooting. During the 2025–26 season with San-en NeoPhoenix, he averaged 5.3 points per game and shot 41.2% from three-point range.

== International career ==
Tsuya represented Japan at the 2016 FIBA Under-18 Asia Championship and the 2017 FIBA Under-19 Basketball World Cup. At the 2017 Under-19 World Cup, he appeared in two games, averaging 3.0 points, 0.5 rebounds and 1.5 assists per game.

He later became part of the senior Japan national team. He made his senior international debut in the 2025 FIBA Asia Cup qualification campaign.

In July 2026, Tsuya was selected for Japan's men's basketball team for the 2026 Asian Games in Aichi-Nagoya. He was listed as a shooting guard and wore number 28.

At the 2026 Asian Games, Tsuya scored 23 points in Japan's opening victory over Indonesia, including seven three-pointers.

Japan reached the men's gold-medal game against South Korea. Tsuya made a three-pointer during the final, but Japan lost the game and finished with the silver medal. The result marked Tsuya's first Asian Games medal.
