= Kotaro Mizumachi =

Japanese handball player (born 1995)

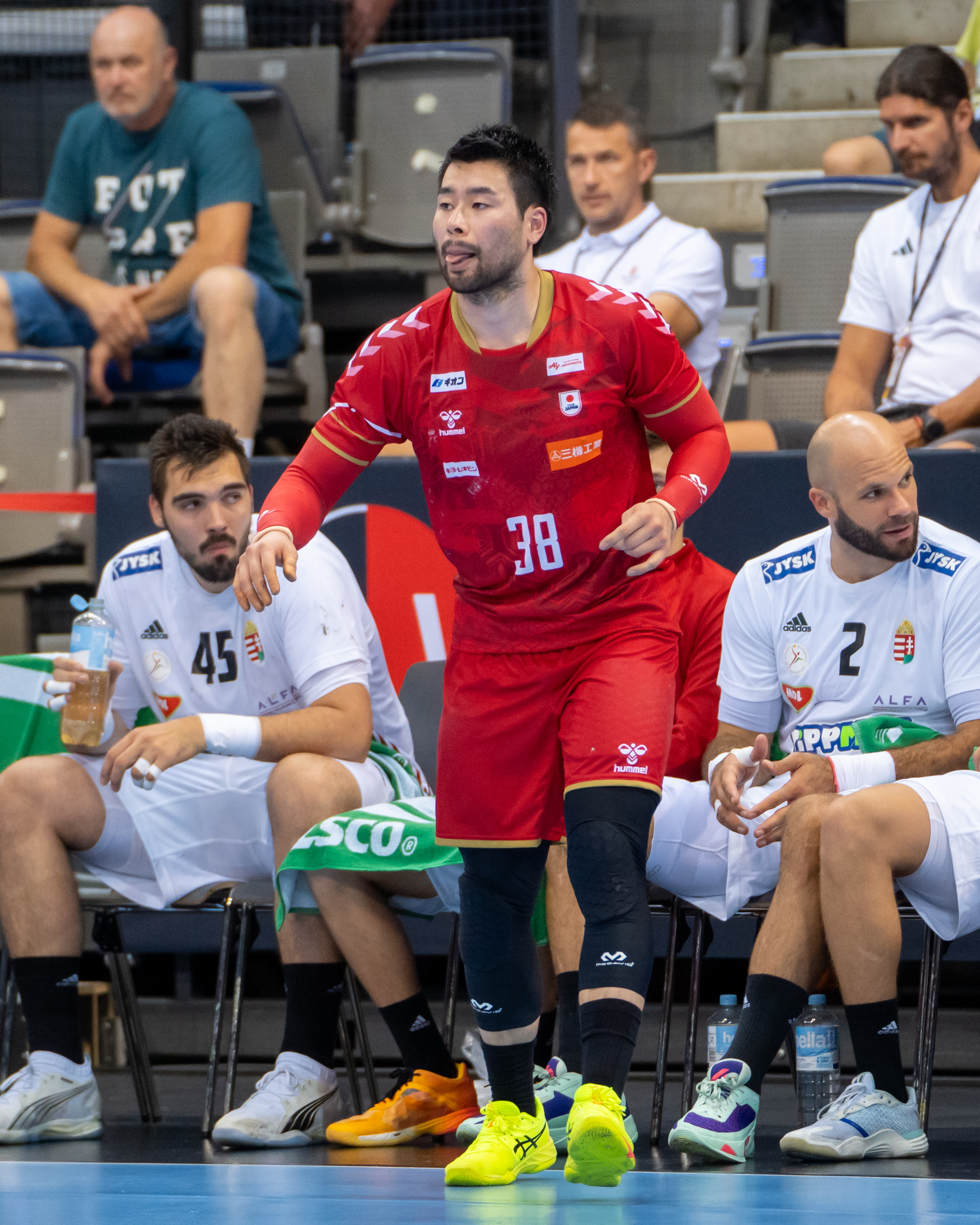

Personal information
- Nationality: Japan
- Born: 13 March 1995 (age 31)
- Height: 184 cm (72 in)

Sport
- Sport: Handball
- Position: Playmaker
- Current club: Toyoda Gosei Blue Falcon
National team
Years	Team	Apps	(Gls)
–	Japan	10	(31)
Medal record
Men's handball
Representing Japan
Asian Games
Bronze medal – third place	2026 Aichi–Nagoya	Team
- Updated on 22 July 2024

Kotaro Mizumachi (水町孝太郎, Mizumachi Kōtarō; born 13 March 1995) is a Japanese handball player who plays for Toyoda Gosei Blue Falcon. He competed in the 2020 Summer Olympics.

He has previously played for the German club VfL Lübeck-Schwartau on a loan deal in the 2021-2022 season.

In 2023 he won the Japanese Championship.
