= Shinji Takashima (basketball) =

Japanese basketball player (born 2000)

No. 12 – Utsunomiya Brex
- Position: Shooting guard
- League: B.League

Personal information
- Born: 13 October 2000 (age 26) Osaka, Japan
- Listed height: 191 cm (6 ft 3 in)
- Listed weight: 90 kg (198 lb)

Career information
- College: Daito Bunka University
- Playing career: 2020–present
Medals
Men's basketball
Representing Japan
Asian Games
Silver medal – second place	2026 Aichi-Nagoya	Men's tournament

Shinji Takashima (Japanese: 高島 紳司; born 13 October 2000) is a Japanese professional basketball player for Utsunomiya Brex of the B.League. A shooting guard, he has represented Japan at senior international level and won a silver medal in the men's tournament at the 2026 Asian Games.

== Career ==
Takashima was born in Osaka and attended Hokuriku High School before studying at Daito Bunka University. He played as a shooting guard and represented Japan at youth level, including with the Japan under-18 national team at the 26th Japan–Korea–China Junior Exchange Competition in 2018.

While at university, Takashima joined the Osaka Evessa as a specially designated player during the 2020–21 season. He continued with Osaka during the 2021–22 season before joining Utsunomiya Brex as a specially designated player in 2022.

Takashima became a regular Utsunomiya player from the 2023–24 season. He has also competed for the club in international competitions, including the Basketball Champions League Asia. In the 2025 Basketball Champions League Asia, he averaged 6 points, 2.4 rebounds and 1.4 assists per game.

In the 2025–26 season, Takashima appeared in 55 regular-season B.League games for Utsunomiya and was named to the East Asia Super League All-Defensive Team. He also played in the club's championship and international competitions.

Takashima was selected for Japan's senior national team in 2026. He was included in the Japanese squad for the 2026 Asian Games in Aichi-Nagoya, where he played at shooting guard. At the 2026 Asian Games, Takashima helped Japan reach the men's final. Japan defeated South Korea in the group stage but later lost to the same team in the gold-medal game, finishing with the silver medal. It was Japan's first men's basketball Asian Games final appearance since the 1962 Asian Games and its first silver medal in the event in 64 years. In the final against South Korea, Takashima started for Japan as the team's shooting guard. Japan lost the gold-medal game and took silver, with Takashima subsequently describing the medal as a result he was pleased to achieve with the team.
