= Yuta Iwashita =

Japanese handball player (born 1991)

Personal information
- Nationality: Japan
- Born: 21 June 1991 (age 35)

Sport
- Sport: Handball
Medal record
Men's handball
Representing Japan
Asian Games
| Bronze medal – third place | 2026 Aichi–Nagoya | Team |

Yuta Iwashita (born 21 June 1991) is a Japanese handball player. He competed in the 2020 Summer Olympics.
