= Jaheru Yamauchi =

Japanese basketball player (born 2002)

Jaheru Ryuto Yamauchi
No. 45 – Kawasaki Brave Thunders
- Position: Shooting guard
- League: B.League

Personal information
- Born: 5 December 2002 (age 23) Okinawa Prefecture, Japan
- Listed height: 190 cm (6 ft 3 in)
- Listed weight: 96 kg (212 lb)

Career information
- College: Daito Bunka University
- Playing career: 2024–present
Medals
Men's basketball
Representing Japan
Asian Games
| Silver medal – second place | 2026 Aichi-Nagoya | Men's tournament |

Jaheru Ryuto Yamauchi (Japanese: 山内 ジャヘル琉人; born 5 December 2002), also known as Jaheru Yamauchi, is a Japanese professional basketball player for the Kawasaki Brave Thunders of the B.League. He plays as a shooting guard and has represented Japan internationally. Yamauchi won a silver medal with Japan at the 2026 Asian Games.

== Early life and high school career ==
Yamauchi was born in Okinawa Prefecture and attended Sendai University Meisei High School in Sendai, Miyagi Prefecture. He began playing basketball as a child and developed into a 190 cm shooting guard known for his athleticism, three-point shooting and ability to attack the basket.

At the 2020 Winter Cup, Yamauchi helped Sendai University Meisei win the men's championship. In the final against Higashiyama High School, he scored 18 points with five rebounds, four assists and six steals as Sendai University Meisei won 72–70. He was subsequently selected to the tournament's Best Five.

=== College career ===
Yamauchi enrolled at Daito Bunka University. As a freshman, he helped the university win the inaugural Men's Rookies Intercollegiate Championship and was named the tournament's Most Valuable Player.

During his university career, Yamauchi was selected to the Japan U22 national team and represented Japan at the 2021 Summer World University Games in Chengdu. He also competed in the Japan–Korea Student Basketball Tournament.

In his third year at university, Yamauchi was named an outstanding player in the Kanto Collegiate Basketball League. He continued to establish himself as one of Daito Bunka University's leading players before joining Kawasaki Brave Thunders as a specially designated player.

=== Professional career ===
In November 2024, Yamauchi joined the Kawasaki Brave Thunders as a specially designated player following the conclusion of the All-Japan Intercollegiate Basketball Championship. He wore number 45.

During his first professional season, Yamauchi made an immediate impact. In March 2025 against the Hiroshima Dragonflies, he recorded 11 points, three rebounds, two assists and one block in the first game of the series. The following day he made his first B.League start and contributed five points, two assists and two steals in Kawasaki's victory.

Yamauchi remained with Kawasaki for the 2025–26 season. He appeared in 34 B.League games during the season, averaging 3.7 points, 1.5 rebounds and 0.7 assists per game, and the club announced that he would continue with the team.

=== International career ===
Yamauchi represented Japan at youth and university level before being selected for the senior national team in 2026. In May 2026, he was named among the candidates for Japan's summer national-team activities, including the 2026 Asian Games. In August 2026, Yamauchi spoke about his preparation for the Asian Games and the importance of establishing his role on the national team. He was part of a young Japanese squad preparing for the tournament on home soil. Yamauchi was selected for Japan's men's basketball team at the 2026 Asian Games in Aichi-Nagoya. Japan reached the gold-medal game against South Korea. In the men's final, Japan lost to South Korea and won the silver medal. Yamauchi appeared for Japan in the final and became an Asian Games silver medallist. The medal was Japan's first men's basketball silver at the Asian Games in 64 years.
