= Soft tennis at the 2026 Asian Games – Mixed doubles =

Mixed doubles at the 2026 Asian Games
- Venue: Higashiyama Park Tennis Center
- Dates: 21 September 2026
- Competitors: 38 from 11 nations

Medalists
gold medal	Yu Kai-wen; Huang Shih-yuan	Chinese Taipei
silver medal	Toshiki Uematsu; Rena Temma	Japan
bronze medal	Kaito Maruyama; Rio Maeda	Japan
bronze medal	Park Jae-kyu; Kim Yeon-hwa	South Korea

The mixed doubles soft tennis event is part of the soft tennis programme and is taking place on 18 until 20 September 2026, at the Higashiyama Park Tennis Center, in Nagoya, Aichi Prefecture.

== Schedule ==
All times are Japan Standard Time (UTC+09:00)

Date	Time	Event
Monday, 21 September 2026	09:00	Preliminary round
Monday, 21 September 2026	12:30	Second stage
Monday, 21 September 2026	14:00	Quarterfinals
Monday, 21 September 2026	15:30	Semifinals
Monday, 21 September 2026	17:00	Final

== Results ==
=== Preliminary round ===
==== Group A ====
Pos	Team	Pld	W	L	GF	GA	GD	Qualification
1	Toshiki Uematsu (JPN) Rena Temma (JPN)	1	1	0	5	0	+5	Quarterfinals
2	Christy Sanosa (PHI) Sherwin Ray Nuguit (PHI)	1	0	1	0	5	−5	Second stage

Source: AG2026

	Score		Game								
	Score		1	2	3	4	5	6	7	8	9
Toshiki Uematsu (JPN); Rena Temma (JPN)	5–0	Christy Sanosa (PHI); Sherwin Ray Nuguit (PHI)	4–1	4–1	4–1	4–1	4–2				

==== Group B ====
Pos	Team	Pld	W	L	GF	GA	GD	Qualification
1	Kim Yeon-hwa (KOR) Park Jae-kyu (KOR)	3	3	0	15	1	+14	Second stage
2	Aadhya Tiwari (IND) Jay Meena (IND)	3	2	1	11	5	+6	Second stage
3	Viva Chao (CAM) Chanroseka Khun (CAM)	3	1	2	5	13	−8	
4	Bud Nyamdorj (MGL) Enkhkhuslen Ganbaatar (MGL)	3	0	3	3	15	−12	

Source: AG2026

	Score		Game								
	Score		1	2	3	4	5	6	7	8	9
Aadhya Tiwari (IND); Jay Meena (IND)	5–0	Viva Chao (CAM); Chanroseka Khun (CAM)	4–1	4–0	4–2	4–1	4–2				
Bud Nyamdorj (MGL); Enkhkhuslen Ganbaatar (MGL)	0–5	Kim Yeon-hwa (KOR); Park Jae-kyu (KOR)	0–4	0–4	1–4	1–4	0–4				
Aadhya Tiwari (IND); Jay Meena (IND)	5–0	Bud Nyamdorj (MGL); Enkhkhuslen Ganbaatar (MGL)	4–2	4–1	4–1	4–0	5–3				
Viva Chao (CAM); Chanroseka Khun (CAM)	0–5	Kim Yeon-hwa (KOR); Park Jae-kyu (KOR)	0–4	1–4	0–4	0–4	2–4				
Viva Chao (CAM); Chanroseka Khun (CAM)	5–3	Bud Nyamdorj (MGL); Enkhkhuslen Ganbaatar (MGL)	4–0	6–4	6–8	4–2	1–4	4–1	2–4	4–2	
Aadhya Tiwari (IND); Jay Meena (IND)	1–5	Kim Yeon-hwa (KOR); Park Jae-kyu (KOR)	1–4	2–4	2–4	5–7	4–1	3–5			

==== Group C ====
Pos	Team	Pld	W	L	GF	GA	GD	Qualification
1	Lin Wei-chieh (TPE) Chiang Min-yu (TPE)	2	2	0	10	2	+8	Quarterfinals
2	Rizky Laluyan (INA) Allif Nafiiah (INA)	2	1	1	7	5	+2	Second stage
3	Sabrina Khan (PAK) Rafae Bashir (PAK)	2	0	2	0	10	−10	

Source: AG2026

	Score		Game								
	Score		1	2	3	4	5	6	7	8	9
Lin Wei-chieh (TPE); Chiang Min-yu (TPE)	5–2	Rizky Laluyan (INA); Allif Nafiiah (INA)	5–3	4–1	2–4	6–4	4–6	4–0	4–0		
Rizky Laluyan (INA); Allif Nafiiah (INA)	5–0	Sabrina Khan (PAK); Rafae Bashir (PAK)	4–1	4–1	4–0	4–0	4–1				
Lin Wei-chieh (TPE); Chiang Min-yu (TPE)	5–0	Sabrina Khan (PAK); Rafae Bashir (PAK)	4–0	5–3	4–0	4–1	4–0				

==== Group D ====
Pos	Team	Pld	W	L	GF	GA	GD	Qualification
1	Kim Hyun-soo (KOR) Lee Su-jin (KOR)	2	2	0	10	2	+8	Quarterfinals
2	Noelle Manalac (PHI) Samuel Nuguit (PHI)	2	1	1	7	5	+2	Second stage
3	Hamza Arain (PAK) Kainaat Shallwani (PAK)	2	0	2	0	10	−10	

Source: AG2026

	Score		Game								
	Score		1	2	3	4	5	6	7	8	9
Kim Hyun-soo (KOR); Lee Su-jin (KOR)	5–0	Hamza Arain (PAK); Kainaat Shallwani (PAK)	4–0	4–0	4–0	4–0	4–0				
Hamza Arain (PAK); Kainaat Shallwani (PAK)	0–5	Noelle Manalac (PHI); Samuel Nuguit (PHI)	2–4	0–4	0–4	0–4	1–4				
Kim Hyun-soo (KOR); Lee Su-jin (KOR)	5–2	Noelle Manalac (PHI); Samuel Nuguit (PHI)	2–4	4–0	4–2	4–2	3–5	4–1	5–3		

==== Group E ====
Pos	Team	Pld	W	L	GF	GA	GD	Qualification
1	Rio Maeda (JPN) Kaito Maruyama (JPN)	3	3	0	15	1	+14	Second stage
2	Fernando Sanger (INA) Siti Arasy (INA)	3	2	1	10	6	+4	Second stage
3	Sophorn Kan (CAM) Sokhoeun Yean (CAM)	3	1	2	5	14	−9	
4	Souvananh Hacnolath (LAO) Sataporn Simmalavong (LAO)	3	0	3	6	15	−9	

Source: AG2026

	Score		Game								
	Score		1	2	3	4	5	6	7	8	9
Rio Maeda (JPN); Kaito Maruyama (JPN)	5–0	Sophorn Kan (CAM); Sokhoeun Yean (CAM)	4–0	4–0	4–0	4–2	4–2				
Souvananh Hacnolath (LAO); Sataporn Simmalavong (LAO)	1–5	Fernando Sanger (INA); Siti Arasy (INA)	2–4	2–4	1–4	0–4	9–7	2–4			
Rio Maeda (JPN); Kaito Maruyama (JPN)	5–1	Souvananh Hacnolath (LAO); Sataporn Simmalavong (LAO)	4–1	5–3	4–1	2–4	4–0	4–1			
Sophorn Kan (CAM); Sokhoeun Yean (CAM)	0–5	Fernando Sanger (INA); Siti Arasy (INA)	2–4	3–5	0–4	1–4	1–4				
Sophorn Kan (CAM); Sokhoeun Yean (CAM)	5–4	Souvananh Hacnolath (LAO); Sataporn Simmalavong (LAO)	7–9	0–4	5–3	4–1	4–6	4–2	4–0	1–4	7–3
Rio Maeda (JPN); Kaito Maruyama (JPN)	5–0	Fernando Sanger (INA); Siti Arasy (INA)	4–2	4–2	4–1	4–2	4–0				

==== Group F ====
Pos	Team	Pld	W	L	GF	GA	GD	Qualification
1	Yu Kai-wen (TPE) Huang Shih-yuan (TPE)	2	2	0	10	0	+10	Quarterfinals
2	Kamal Bhandari (NEP) Georgia Chaudhary (NEP)	2	1	1	5	9	−4	Second stage
3	Khaliunbayar Khurelbayar (MGL) Khongorzul Ganbold (MGL)	2	0	2	4	10	−6	

Source: AG2026

	Score		Game								
	Score		1	2	3	4	5	6	7	8	9
Yu Kai-wen (TPE); Huang Shih-yuan (TPE)	5–0	Kamal Bhandari (NEP); Georgia Chaudhary (NEP)	4–0	4–0	4–0	4–0	4–0				
Kamal Bhandari (NEP); Georgia Chaudhary (NEP)	5–4	Khaliunbayar Khurelbayar (MGL); Khongorzul Ganbold (MGL)	5–4	3–5	4–2	1–4	5–3	1–4	4–0	3–5	7–5
Yu Kai-wen (TPE); Huang Shih-yuan (TPE)	5–0	Khaliunbayar Khurelbayar (MGL); Khongorzul Ganbold (MGL)	5–0	5–3	4–0	4–1	4–1				

=== Knockout round ===
==== = Final ====
Final
A1	Toshiki Uematsu (JPN); Rena Temma (JPN)	4	3	2	4	4	0	4	1	5
F1	Yu Kai-wen (TPE); Huang Shih-yuan (TPE)	2	5	4	1	1	4	1	4	7

==== Top half ====
Second stage								Quarterfinals											Semifinals
								A1	Toshiki Uematsu (JPN); Rena Temma (JPN)	4	2	4	1	4	4	4
F2	Kamal Bhandari (NEP); Georgia Chaudhary (NEP)	2	0	4	0	4	1	E2	Fernando Sanger (INA); Siti Arasy (INA)	1	4	2	4	1	1	1
E2	Fernando Sanger (INA); Siti Arasy (INA)	4	4	6	4	2	4												A1	Toshiki Uematsu (JPN); Rena Temma (JPN)	7	1	6	4	5	4
B1	Kim Yeon-hwa (KOR); Park Jae-kyu (KOR)	4	4	4	4	4													B1	Kim Yeon-hwa (KOR); Park Jae-kyu (KOR)	5	4	4	1	3	1
D2	Noelle Manalac (PHI); Samuel Nuguit (PHI)	1	0	2	1	2		B1	Kim Yeon-hwa (KOR); Park Jae-kyu (KOR)	1	3	6	0	0	4	4	4	7
								C1	Lin Wei-chieh (TPE); Chiang Min-yu (TPE)	4	5	4	4	4	2	2	1	3

==== Bottom half ====
Second stage									Quarterfinals								Semifinals
									D1	Kim Hyun-soo (KOR); Lee Su-jin (KOR)	2	2	2	4	2	5
E1	Rio Maeda (JPN); Kaito Maruyama (JPN)	4	4	4	4	4			E1	Rio Maeda (JPN); Kaito Maruyama (JPN)	4	4	4	1	4	7
C2	Rizky Laluyan (INA); Allif Nafiiah (INA)	1	1	2	2	1											E1	Rio Maeda (JPN); Kaito Maruyama (JPN)	0	3	4	2	2
B2	Aadhya Tiwari (IND); Jay Meena (IND)	4	2	2	3	2	5	6									F1	Yu Kai-wen (TPE); Huang Shih-yuan (TPE)	4	5	6	4	4
A2	Christy Sanosa (PHI); Sherwin Ray Nuguit (PHI)	2	4	4	5	4	3	8	A2	Christy Sanosa (PHI); Sherwin Ray Nuguit (PHI)	2	2	3	2	1
									F1	Yu Kai-wen (TPE); Huang Shih-yuan (TPE)	4	4	5	4	4
