= Mixed martial arts at the 2026 Asian Games =

- Venue: Inae Sports Center
- Dates: 20–22 September 2026
- Competitors: 55 from 21 nations

Mixed martial arts at the 2026 Asian Games was held between 20 and 22 September 2026 at the Inae Sports Center. This marked the sport's debut at the Asian Games.

== Schedule ==
The schedule was as follows:

P	Preliminary rounds	QF	Quarterfinals	SF	Semifinals	F	Final

date Event	20 Sun		21 Mon	22 Tue
Men's events
Men's modern 60 kg	P	QF	SF	F
Men's traditional 65 kg	P	QF	SF	F
Men's modern 71 kg	P	QF	SF	F
Men's traditional 77 kg	P	QF	SF	F
Women's events
Women's modern 54 kg	P	QF	SF	F
Women's traditional 60 kg	P	QF	SF	F

== Medal summary ==
=== Medal table ===
* Host nation (Japan)

Rank	Nation	Gold	Silver	Bronze	Total
1	Tajikistan	2	1	0	3
2	Kazakhstan	2	0	1	3
3	Singapore	1	0	0	1
3	Thailand	1	0	0	1
5	Uzbekistan	0	2	1	3
6	Bahrain	0	2	0	2
7	Philippines	0	1	1	2
8	Kyrgyzstan	0	0	3	3
9	Cambodia	0	0	1	1
9	India	0	0	1	1
9	Indonesia	0	0	1	1
9	Japan*	0	0	1	1
9	Pakistan	0	0	1	1
9	South Korea	0	0	1	1
Totals (14 entries)		6	6	12	24

=== Medalists ===
==== Men's events ====
Event	Gold	Silver	Bronze
Modern 60 kg	Mirzobek Umarov; Tajikistan	Firdavs Atamuratov; Uzbekistan	Dastan Kanybek Uulu; Kyrgyzstan
Modern 60 kg	Mirzobek Umarov; Tajikistan	Firdavs Atamuratov; Uzbekistan	Asim Khan; Pakistan
Traditional 65 kg	Otabek Rajabov; Tajikistan	Jean Claude Saclag; Philippines	Sanzhar Adilov; Kazakhstan
Traditional 65 kg	Otabek Rajabov; Tajikistan	Jean Claude Saclag; Philippines	Daisuke Murayama; Japan
Modern 71 kg	Kadyrbek Shinbayev; Kazakhstan	Behruz Khurshedzoda; Tajikistan	Yryskeldi Duysheev; Kyrgyzstan
Modern 71 kg	Kadyrbek Shinbayev; Kazakhstan	Behruz Khurshedzoda; Tajikistan	Nodirbek Shavkatov; Uzbekistan
Traditional 77 kg	Yerkingali Burkutalin; Kazakhstan	Mukhammad Nabiev; Bahrain	Syimyk Zhanybek Uulu; Kyrgyzstan
Traditional 77 kg	Yerkingali Burkutalin; Kazakhstan	Mukhammad Nabiev; Bahrain	Carlos Alvarez; Philippines

==== Women's events ====
Event	Gold	Silver	Bronze
Modern 54 kg	Kanjutha Phattaraboonsorn; Thailand	Diana Pogosian; Bahrain	Lee Bo-mi; South Korea
Modern 54 kg	Kanjutha Phattaraboonsorn; Thailand	Diana Pogosian; Bahrain	Vallensia Fahira Hotmauli; Indonesia
Traditional 60 kg	Teo Hui Hoon; Singapore	Khiola Sobirova; Uzbekistan	Suchika Tariyal; India
Traditional 60 kg	Teo Hui Hoon; Singapore	Khiola Sobirova; Uzbekistan	Dalin Cheng; Cambodia

== Participating nations ==
- Bahrain (4)
- Cambodia (2)
- Chinese Taipei (3)
- India (2)
- Indonesia (3)
- Iran (3)
- Japan (3)
- Jordan (3)
- Kazakhstan (4)
- Kyrgyzstan (4)
- Mongolia (1)
- Pakistan (1)
- Palestine (1)
- Philippines (3)
- Saudi Arabia (3)
- Singapore (1)
- South Korea (3)
- Tajikistan (3)
- Thailand (2)
- Uzbekistan (4)
- Vietnam (2)
