= Pakistan at the 2026 Asian Games =

- Pakistani flag
- IOC code: PAK
- NOC: Pakistan Olympic Association
- Website: www.nocpakistan.org

in Aichi–Nagoya, Japan 19 September 2026 – 4 October 2026
- Competitors: 165 (121 men and 44 women) in 23 sports
- Flag bearers: Noor Zaman; Fatima Sana
- Medals Ranked 29th: Gold 0 Silver 2 Bronze 8 Total 10

Asian Games appearances (overview)
- 1954; 1958; 1962; 1966; 1970; 1974; 1978; 1982; 1986; 1990; 1994; 1998; 2002; 2006; 2010; 2014; 2018; 2022; 2026

Pakistan competed at the 2026 Asian Games held at Nagoya, Aichi Prefecture, Japan from 19 September to 4 October 2026. This was the country's nineteenth appearance at the competition.

Pakistan finished the games with 10 medals (2 silver, 8 bronze), its best haul since the 2002 Busan Games, where it won 13 medals. The campaign ended several long droughts, including Pakistan's first Asian Games volleyball medal since 1962, first field hockey medal since 2014, Ghulam Mustafa Bashir secured Pakistan's first men's shooting medal, first-ever medals in Esports and Mixed martial arts, first cricket medals since 2014 (women) and 2010 (men), and first squash singles medals since 2010.

== Competitors ==
Sport	Men	Women	Total
Athletics	4	3	7
Badminton	1	1	2
Boxing	2	2	4
Cricket	15	14	29
Equestrian	1	0	1
Esports	8	0	8
Fencing	5	0	5
Field hockey	18	0	18
Kabaddi	12	0	12
Mixed martial arts	1	0	1
Rowing	1	0	1
Sailing	2	1	3
Shooting	7	2	9
Soft tennis	5	5	10
Squash	4	4	8
Swimming	1	2	3
Table tennis	5	4	9
Taekwondo	3	1	4
Tennis	4	2	6
Triathlon	3	2	5
Volleyball	12	0	12
Wrestling	4	0	4
Wushu	3	1	4
Total	121	44	165

== Medal summary ==
Medals by sport
Sport	Gold	Silver	Bronze	Total
Squash	0	1	2	3
Cricket	0	1	1	2
Esports	0	0	1	1
Field hockey	0	0	1	1
Mixed martial arts	0	0	1	1
Shooting	0	0	1	1
Volleyball	0	0	1	1
Total	0	2	8	10

Medals by gender
Gender	Gold	Silver	Bronze	Total
Male	0	2	7	9
Female	0	0	1	1
Mixed/Open	0	0	0	0
Total	0	2	8	10

Medals by day
Day	Date	Gold	Silver	Bronze	Total
1	20 September	0	0	0	0
2	21 September	0	0	1	1
3	22 September	0	0	1	1
4	23 September	0	0	0	0
5	24 September	0	0	0	0
6	25 September	0	0	0	0
7	26 September	0	0	2	2
8	27 September	0	0	0	0
9	28 September	0	0	0	0
10	29 September	0	0	1	1
11	30 September	0	0	0	0
12	1 October	0	0	1	1
13	2 October	0	1	0	1
14	3 October	0	1	2	3
15	4 October	0	0	0	0
	Total	0	2	8	10

Medalists

Medal	Name	Sport	Event	Date
Silver	Nasir Iqbal; Muhammad Ashab Irfan; Asim Khan; Noor Zaman	Squash	Men's team	2 October
Silver	Pakistan men's national cricket team: Sahibzada Farhan; Abdul Samad; Abrar Ahmed; Haider Ali; Saim Ayub; Ahmed Daniyal; Akif Javed; Usman Khan; Arafat Minhas; Salman Mirza; Saad Masood; Sufyan Moqim; Hasan Nawaz; Ali Raza; Maaz Sadaqat	Cricket	Men's tournament	3 October
Bronze	Asim Khan	Mixed martial arts	Men's modern 60 kg	21 September
Bronze	Pakistan women's national cricket team: Fatima Sana; Muneeba Ali; Humna Bilal; Eyman Fatima; Gull Feroza; Umm-e-Hani; Tuba Hassan; Saira Jabeen; Eman Naseer; Momina Riasat; Aliya Riaz; Tasmia Rubab; Nashra Sandhu; Ayesha Zafar; Shawaal Zulfiqar	Cricket	Women's tournament	22 September
Bronze	Muhammad Ashab Irfan	Squash	Men's singles	26 September
Bronze	Noor Zaman	Squash	Men's singles	26 September
Bronze	4Thrives Walee: Shayan Asad; Muhammad Huzaifa; Falak Sher Memon; Hasnain Rahman; Syed Sameer	Esports	PUBG Mobile	29 September
Bronze	Ghulam Mustafa Bashir	Shooting	Men's 25 metre rapid fire pistol	1 October
Bronze	Pakistan men's national volleyball team: Abu Bakar Siddique; Afaq Khan; Muhammad Yahya; Murad Khan; Fahad Raza; Hamid Yazman; Jabran; Muhammad Hamad; Murad Jehan; Musawer Khan; Khizar Hayat; Usman Faryad Ali	Volleyball	Men's tournament	3 October
Bronze	Pakistan men's national field hockey team: Abdul Manan; Abdul Rehman; Abu Mahmood; Adeel Latif; Afraz; Ahmad Nadeem; Ali Raza; Ammad Butt; Arshad Liaqat; Ghazanfar Ali; Hannan Shahid; Moin Shakeel; Muhammad Ammad; Muhammad Abdullah; Muhammad Hammadudin; Sufyan Khan; Waqar Ali; Umar Mustafa; Waheed Rana; Zikriya Hayat	Field hockey	Men's tournament	3 October

== Athletics ==
Track Events

Athletes	Event	Heats		Semifinal		Final	
Athletes	Event	Result	Rank	Result	Rank	Result	Rank
Shajar Abbas	Men's 200 m	21.23	17 Q	21.30	17	Did not advance	
Faiqa Riaz	Women's 100 m	11.96	19	Did not advance			
Khoula Omer Khan	Women's 200 m	26.53	23	—N/a		Did not advance	

Field Events

Athletes	Event	Qualification		Final	
Athletes	Event	Result	Rank	Result	Rank
Ansar Abbas	Men's Long Jump	7.28	12 q	7.09	12
Arshad Nadeem	Men's Javelin Throw	—N/a		80.29	4
Muhammad Yasir	Men's Javelin Throw	—N/a		73.50	9
Noreen Hussain	Women's pole vault	—N/a		NM	DNF

== Badminton ==
Athlete	Event	Round of 64	Round of 32	Round of 16	Quarterfinals	Semi-finals	Final	
Athlete	Event	Opposition Score	Opposition Score	Opposition Score	Opposition Score	Opposition Score	Opposition Score	Rank
Muhammad Ali Larosh	Men's singles	Tajibullayev (KAZ); L (11–21, 24–22, 22–24)	Did not advance					
Mahoor Shahzad	Women's singles	Bye	Wardani (INA); L (5–21, 11–21)	Did not advance				
Muhammad Ali Larosh; Mahoor Shahzad	Mixed doubles	—N/a	Kim / Jang (KOR); L (1–21, 10–21)	Did not advance				

== Boxing ==
Boxer	Event	Round of 32	Round of 16	Quarterfinals	Semi-finals	Final	Rank
Boxer	Event	Opposition Result	Opposition Result	Opposition Result	Opposition Result	Opposition Result	Rank
Sumama Rehman	Men's 55 kg	Sufijonov (TJK); L 0–5	Did not advance				
Irfan Khan	Men's 90 kg	—N/a	Kim (KOR); L KO	Did not advance			
Maria	Women's 51 kg	Bye	Oyuntsetseg (MGL); L RSC	Did not advance			
Fatima Zahra	Women's 60 kg	—N/a	Samadova (TJK); L 0–5	Did not advance			

== Cricket ==
Both the men's and women's cricket teams have qualified as full members of the ICC. The Pakistan Cricket Board announced the men's squad on 10 June 2026.

Team	Event	Group Stage			Quarterfinal	Semifinal	Final / BM	
Team	Event	Opposition Score	Opposition Score	Rank	Opposition Score	Opposition Score	Opposition Score	Rank
Pakistan men's	Men's	Bye			Hong Kong; W NR	Bangladesh; W 6 wickets	India; L 19 runs	2nd place, silver medalist(s)
Pakistan women's	Women's	—N/a			Thailand; W 3 wickets	Sri Lanka; L 8 wickets	Bangladesh; W 31 runs	3rd place, bronze medalist(s)

Men's tournament

Coach
(New Zealand) Mike Hesson
Squad

- Sahibzada Farhan (c)
- Abdul Samad (vc)
- Abrar Ahmed
- Haider Ali
- Saim Ayub
- Ahmed Daniyal
- Akif Javed
- Usman Khan (wk)
- Arafat Minhas
- Salman Mirza
- Saad Masood
- Sufyan Moqim
- Hasan Nawaz
- Ali Raza
- Maaz Sadaqat

Quarter-final

Quarterfinal 1
28 September 2026
09:00
Scorecard

Hong Kong	v	Pakistan

Match abandoned
Kōrogi Sports Park, Nisshin
Umpires: Viswanadan Kalidas (Mas) and Prageeth Rambukwella (SL)

- No toss.
- No play was possible due to rain.
- Pakistan advanced by virtue of being the higher-seeded team.

Semi-final

Semifinal 1
1 October 2026
09:00
Scorecard

Bangladesh; 111/7 (13 overs)	v	Pakistan; 112/4 (11.3 overs)
Towhid Hridoy 42 (25); Sufyan Moqim 3/26 (3 overs)		Abdul Samad 30* (15); Rishad Hossain 1/12 (2.3 overs)

Pakistan won by 6 wickets
Kōrogi Sports Park, Nisshin
Umpires: Prageeth Rambukwella (SL) and Nitin Menon (Ind)

- Pakistan won the toss and elected to field.
- The match was reduced to 13 overs per side due to wet outfield.
- Sahibzada Farhan captained Pakistan for the first time in T20Is.

Gold medal match

3 October 2026
14:00
Scorecard

India; 211/6 (20 overs)	v	Pakistan; 192/6 (20 overs)
Abhishek Sharma 61 (28); Arafat Minhas 2/25 (3 overs)		Hassan Nawaz 96 (51); Axar Patel 2/29 (4 overs); Washington Sundar 2/29 (4 overs)

India won by 19 runs
Kōrogi Sports Park, Nisshin
Umpires: Prageeth Rambukwella (SL) and Gazi Sohel (Ban)

- India won the toss and elected to bat.
- Saad Masood (Pak) made his T20I debut.

Women's tournament

Coach
Squad

- Fatima Sana (c)
- Muneeba Ali (wk)
- Humna Bilal
- Eyman Fatima
- Gull Feroza
- Umm-e-Hani
- Tuba Hassan
- Saira Jabeen
- Eman Naseer
- Momina Riasat
- Aliya Riaz
- Tasmia Rubab
- Nashra Sandhu
- Ayesha Zafar
- Shawaal Zulfiqar

Quarter-final

Quarter-final 2
17 September 2026
14:00
Scorecard

Thailand; 91/4 (11 overs)	v	Pakistan; 92/7 (10.4 overs)
Nannapat Koncharoenkai 49 (38); Fatima Sana 2/22 (3 overs)		Shawaal Zulfiqar 25 (14); Onnicha Kamchomphu 3/37 (3 overs)

Pakistan won by 3 wickets
Kōrogi Sports Park, Nisshin
Umpires: Shivani Mishra (Qat) and Nimali Perera (SL)

- Pakistan won the toss and elected to field.
- The match was reduced to 11 overs per side due to rain.

Semi-final

Semi-final 1
20 September 2026
09:00
Scorecard

Pakistan; 177/4 (20 overs)	v	Sri Lanka; 178/2 (17.5 overs)
Ayesha Zafar 71 (40); Kawya Kavindi 1/13 (2 overs)		Chamari Athapaththu 83* (50); Fatima Sana 1/24 (3 overs)

Sri Lanka won by 8 wickets
Kōrogi Sports Park, Nisshin
Umpires: Shathira Jakir (Ban) and Shivani Mishra (Qat)

- Sri Lanka won the toss and elected to field.
- This was the highest successful run chase for Sri Lanka in WT20Is.

Bronze medal match

22 September 2026
14:00
Scorecard

India; 216/3 (20 overs)	v	Sri Lanka; 69 (15.4 overs)
Smriti Mandhana 79 (45); Chamudi Praboda 1/34 (4 overs)		Chamari Athapaththu 29 (21); Deepti Sharma 3/6 (4 overs)

India won by 147 runs
Kōrogi Sports Park, Nisshin
Umpires: Saleema Imtiaz (Pak) and Shathira Jakir (Ban)

- India won the toss and elected to bat.
- India won the gold medal.

== Equestrian ==
Pakistan made its historic debut in equestrian eventing at the 2026 Asian Games, fielding a team for the first time in the discipline. The squad was selected by the Pakistan Equestrian Federation after a series of qualifying events. In the lead-up to the Games, Usman and Mirage are ranked as the No. 1 combination in the FEI Middle East and Africa Region. His qualification came after a strong performance at a three-star international eventing competition in France, where he finished sixth overall and was the highest-ranked Asian rider.

He finished 16th out of 32 riders in Individual Eventing with a final score of 55.90 penalty points, breaking down into 36.70 penalty points in dressage, 8.00 penalty points in show jumping, and 11.20 penalty points in cross-country.

Eventing

Athlete	Horse	Event	Dressage		Jumping		Cross-country		Total	Rank
Athlete	Horse	Event	Overall	Rank	Overall	Rank	Overall	Rank	Total	Rank
Usman Khan	Eden Du Veret (Mirage)	Individual	36.70	19	44.70	20	55.90	16	55.90	16

== Esports ==
4Thrives Walee made history as Pakistan won its first ever Asian Games Esports medal, claiming bronze in PUBG Mobile.

Gamer	Event	Group stage				Rank	Quarter-final	Semi-final	Final	Rank
Gamer	Event	Opposition Score	Opposition Score	Opposition Score	Opposition Score	Rank	Opposition Score	Opposition Score	Opposition Score	Rank
Adeel Ahmed; Atif Ijaz; Ahmed Shahid	Competitive Martial Arts	Thailand; L 1–3	Syria; W 3–0	Chinese Taipei; W 3–2	—N/a	3	Did not advance			

Gamers	Event	Match												WWCD	Total	Rank
Gamers	Event	1	2	3	4	5	6	7	8	9	10	11	12	WWCD	Total	Rank
Shayan Asad; Muhammad Huzaifa; Falak Sher Memon; Hasnain Rahman; Syed Sameer	PUBG Mobile	4	16	0	1	10	8	16	10	10	6	12	7	0	100	3rd place, bronze medalist(s)

== Fencing ==
Individual

Athlete	Event	Preliminaries							Round of 32	Round of 16	Quarterfinals	Semi-finals	Final
Athlete	Event	Opposition Score	Opposition Score	Opposition Score	Opposition Score	Opposition Score	Opposition Score	Rank	Opposition Score	Opposition Score	Opposition Score	Opposition Score	Opposition Score
Abdul Musawir	Men's Épée	Batbyamba (MGL); L 3–5	Lee (SGP); L 2–5	Fong (HKG); L 1–5	Timurov (UZB); L 2–5	Alomairi (KSA); L 2–5	Al Zarooni (UAE); L 2–5	39	Did not advance				
Muhammad Waqas	Men's Épée	Uulu (KGZ); L 3–5	Aljadra (QAT); L 2–5	Yamada (JPN); L 2–5	Ulaankhuu (MGL); L 2–5	Imtiaj (BAN); L 4–5	NG (HKG); L 2–5	38	Did not advance				
Baryal Khan	Men's Foil	Sachin (IND); L 0–5	Youn (KOR); L 1–5	Narmandakh (MGL); W 5–2	Nurumov (KAZ); L 1–5	Chen (TPE); L 2–5	—N/a	32	Did not advance				
Muhammad Yaseen Khan	Men's Foil	Poorgharib (QAT); L 0–5	Semyonov (KAZ); L 1–5	Lee (KOR); L 0–5	Keskes (OMA); L 0–5	Zeng (CHN); L 0–5	—N/a	36	Did not advance				
Muhammad Nauman Ejaz	Men's Sabre	Pakdaman (IRI); L 0–5	Abdulkareem (KUW); L 0–5	Nguyen (VIE); L 1–5	Luo (CHN); L 0–5	Villanueva (PHI); L 1–5	—N/a	29	Did not advance				

Team

Athletes	Event	Round of 16	Quarterfinals	Semi-finals	Final	
Athletes	Event	Opposition Score	Opposition Score	Opposition Score	Opposition Score	Rank
Baryal Khan; Muhammad Yaseen Khan; Abdul Musawir; Muhammad Waqas	Men's foil	China (CHN); L 12–45	Did not advance			
Baryal Khan; Muhammad Yaseen Khan; Abdul Musawir; Muhammad Waqas	Men's épée	Qatar (QAT); L 5–7	Did not advance			

== Field hockey ==
The Pakistani men's team qualified for the Games by finishing in the top-six teams in the previous edition.

Men's tournament

Team	Group Stage						Semi-final	Final / BM	
Team	Opposition Result	Opposition Result	Opposition Result	Opposition Result	Opposition Result	Rank	Opposition Result	Opposition Result	Rank
Men's team	Thailand; W 9–0	Uzbekistan; W 5–1	China; W 3–0	Malaysia; L 4–5	Oman; W 7–2	2 Q	India; L 3–4	South Korea; W 5–3	3rd place, bronze medalist(s)

Squad

- Abdul Manan
- Abdul Rehman
- Abu Mahmood (C)
- Adeel Latif
- Afraz
- Ahmad Nadeem
- Ali Raza (GK)
- Ammad Butt
- Arshad Liaqat
- Ghazanfar Ali
- Hannan Shahid
- Moin Shakeel
- Muhammad Ammad
- Muhammad Abdullah
- Muhammad Hammadudin
- Sufyan Khan
- Waqar Ali (GK)
- Umar Mustafa
- Waheed Rana
- Zikriya Hayat

Pool B

Pos	Team	Pld	W	D	L	GF	GA	GD	Pts	Qualification
1	Malaysia	5	5	0	0	34	4	+30	15	Semi-finals
2	Pakistan	5	4	0	1	28	8	+20	12	Semi-finals
3	China	5	3	0	2	13	10	+3	9	Fifth place classification
4	Thailand	5	2	0	3	5	28	−23	6	Fifth place classification
5	Uzbekistan	5	1	0	4	6	20	−14	3	Ninth place game
6	Oman	5	0	0	5	4	20	−16	0	Eleventh place game

Source: FIH
Rules for classification: 1) points; 2) matches won; 3) goal difference; 4) goals for; 5) head-to-head result; 6) field goals for.

20 September 2026
19:00

Pakistan	9–0	Thailand
Shakeel 8'; Butt 12'; Nadeem 20', 37', 43'; Khan 22', 23'; Rana 31'; Shahid 34'	Report

Gifu Prefectural Green Stadium
Umpires:
Akalanka Ishan Kumara (SRI)
You Hyo-sik (KOR)

22 September 2026
09:00

Pakistan	5–1	Uzbekistan
Ammad 18'; Khan 33', 57'; Rehman 40'; Mahmood 45'	Report	Salimjonov 30+'

Gifu Prefectural Green Stadium
Umpires:
Zhou Fuyi (CHN)
Coen van Bunge (NED)

24 September 2026
19:00

China	0–3	Pakistan
	Report	Mahmood 19'; Khan 24'; Shahid 28'

Gifu Prefectural Green Stadium
Umpires:
Hideki Kinoshita (JPN)
Deepak Joshi (IND)

26 September 2026
13:00

Malaysia	5–4	Pakistan
Silverius 5', 56'; Fa. Saari 23'; Fi. Saari 45'; Azrai 57'	Report	Khan 3', 39', 43', 46'

Gifu Prefectural Green Stadium
Umpires:
You Hyo-sik (KOR)
James Unkles (AUS)

28 September 2026
15:00

Pakistan	7–2	Oman
Khan 22', 28'; Rana 34', 44', 59'; Ali 40'; Ammad 46'	Report	Al-Nofli 28'; Madit 36'

Gifu Prefectural Green Stadium
Umpires:
Akalanka Ishan Kumara (SRI)
Khalid Hussain (HKG)

Semi-final

1 October 2026
16:30

India	4–3	Pakistan
Harmanpreet 5', 13'; Sukhjeet 23'; Abhishek 60'	Report	Mahmood 30'; Shahid 45'; Rana 49'

Gifu Prefectural Green Stadium
Umpires:
You Hyo-sik (KOR)
Rawi Anbananthan (MAS)

Bronze medal match

3 October 2026
16:30

Pakistan	5–3	South Korea
Khan 4'; Abdul 30'; Rana 52', 54'; Shahid 59'	Report	Lee G. 12'; Kim Y. 18'; Yang 25'

Gifu Prefectural Green Stadium
Umpires:
Coen van Bunge (NED)
Rawi Anbananthan (MAS)

== Kabaddi ==
A twelve member squad for the men's tournament at the Asian Games was announced by the Pakistan Kabaddi Federation. In the group stage of the tournament, the team suffered defeats to Thailand and Iran. As a result, Pakistan failed to qualify for the semi-finals, which marked the first time the men's team failed to finish on the podium at the Asian Games.

Men's tournament

Team	Event	Group stage					Semi-final	Final	
Team	Event	Opposition Score	Opposition Score	Opposition Score	Opposition Score	Rank	Opposition Score	Opposition Score	Rank
Men's team	Men's tournament	Malaysia; W 65–22	Nepal; W 58–43	Thailand; L 45–48	Iran; L 30–51	3	Did not advance		

Squad

- Afaq Khan
- Akhlaq Ahmed
- Bilal Khan
- Faizan Ali
- Farhan Ali
- Mudassar Ali
- Muhammad Qasim
- Muhammad Umair Naseem
- Muhammad Usman Arshad
- Muhammad Zohaib Niaz
- Rahat Maqsood Ali
- Shoaib Mumtaz Ali
- Usman Ahmad

== Mixed martial arts ==
The Pakistan Mixed Martial Arts Federation confirmed that Asim Khan will represent Pakistan as an athlete, while Abu Huraira has been selected as an International Technical Official (ITO)/Referee, and Dilawar Khan Sanan will serve as the team official.

Modern

Athlete	Event	Round of 16	Quarterfinal	Semi-final	Final	Rank
Athlete	Event	Opposition Result	Opposition Result	Opposition Result	Opposition Result	Rank
Asim Khan	Men's 60 kg	Ababneh (JOR); W 1–DSQ	Pheng (CAM); W 3–0	Umarov (TJK); L 0–3	Did not advance	3rd place, bronze medalist(s)

== Rowing ==
Athlete	Event	Heat		Final	
Athlete	Event	Time	Rank	Time	Rank
Asad Iqbal	Men's lightweight single sculls	7:43.54	4 FB	7:06.72	8

== Sailing ==
Athlete	Event	Race										Total Points	Net Points	Final Rank	Final Race			Total Points	Net Points	Final Rank
Athlete	Event	1	2	3	4	5	6	7	8	9	10	Total Points	Net Points	Final Rank	Recal points	MR1	MR2	Total Points	Net Points	Final Rank
Muzammil Hassan	Men's ILCA 7	12	16	8	13	2	13	10	12	8	—N/a	93	77	10 Q	25	10	10	45	45	10
Nadine Xerxes Avari; Mehboob	Mixed 470	6	8	5	6	8	8	10	8	6	8	63	73	8	—N/a					

== Shooting ==
In August 2026, the National Rifle Association of Pakistan announced a 11-member squad for the shooting events in the Games. Russian coach Vladimir Kovalenko served as head coach, while Commander Fazal-ul-Bari was appointed manager. NRAP senior official and coach Razi Ahmed Khan said an additional shooter could still be added to the final list. However, before the start of the games, Pakistan suffered a setback when six out of nine shooters missed the competition because they were unable to receive the required NOCs including Asian Trap champion Farrukh Nadeem and reigning Asian Games bronze medalist Kishmala Talat. Only two shooters competed, Rabia Kabir and Ghulam Mustafa Bashir, with Bashir winning bronze in the men's 25m rapid fire pistol, his first Asian Games medal and the first by a Pakistani man in shooting at the Games.

Athlete	Event	Qualification		Final	
Athlete	Event	Score	Rank	Score	Rank
Muhammad Uzman	Men's 10 m air rifle	DNS			
Ghulam Mustafa Bashir	Men's 25 m rapid fire pistol	578	6 Q	22	3rd place, bronze medalist(s)
Mohammad Shabbir	Men's 25 m rapid fire pistol	DNS			
Mohammad Umar	Men's 25 m rapid fire pistol	DNS			
Imam Haroon	Men's skeet	DNS			
Usman Chand	Men's skeet	DNS			
Farrukh Nadeem	Men's trap	DNS			
Rabia Kabir	Women's 10 m air pistol	569	22	Did not advance	
Rabia Kabir	Women's 25 m pistol	567	33	Did not advance	
Kishmala Talat	Women's 10 m air pistol	DNS			
Kishmala Talat	Women's 25 m pistol	DNS			
Ghulam Mustafa Bashir; Mohammad Shabbir; Mohammad Umar	Men's 25 m rapid fire pistol team	—N/a		DNS	

== Soft tennis ==
Athlete	Event	Preliminary Round				Quarter-finals	Semi-finals	Final	
Athlete	Event	Opposition Score	Opposition Score	Opposition Score	Rank	Opposition Score	Opposition Score	Opposition Score	Rank
Muhammad Ali	Men's singles	Hutauruk (INA); L 0–4	Uematsu (JPN); L 0–4	Doeum (CAM); L 0–4	4	Did not advance			
Hussain Arain	Men's singles	Meena (IND); L 0–4	—N/a		2	Did not advance			
Muhammad Ali; Hamza Arain; Hussain Arain; Rafae Bashir; Muhammad Khan	Men's team	Philippines (PHI); L 0–3	Cambodia (CAM); L 0–3	Japan (JPN); L 0–3	4	Did not advance			
Kainaat Shallwani	Women's singles	Ziegler (THA); L 0–4	Tiwari (IND); L 0–4	—N/a	3	Did not advance			
Syeda Zaidi	Women's singles	Miyamae (JPN); L 0–4	Sanosa (PHI); L 0–4	—N/a	3	Did not advance			
Fizza Ali; Sabrina Khan; Syeda Naushad; Kainaat Shallwani; Syeda Zaidi	Women's team	South Korea (KOR); L 0–3	Japan (JPN); L 0–3	Cambodia (CAM); L 0–3	4	—N/a	Did not advance		
Hussain Arain; Kainaat Shallwani	Mixed doubles	Kim / Lee (KOR); L 0–5	Nuguit / Manalac (PHI); L 0–5	—N/a	3	Did not advance			
Rafae Bashir; Sabrina Khan	Mixed doubles	Laluyan / Nafiiah (INA); L 0–5	Lin / Chiang (TPE); L 0–5	—N/a	3	Did not advance			

== Squash ==
Singles

Athlete	Event	Round of 64	Round of 32	Round of 16	Quarterfinals	Semi-finals	Final / Classification	Rank
Athlete	Event	Opposition Score	Opposition Score	Opposition Score	Opposition Score	Opposition Score	Opposition Score	Rank
Noor Zaman	Men's	Bye	Angelo Dalida (PHI); W 3–0	Al-Tamimi (KUW); W 3–0	Leung (HKG); W 3–1	Ng (MAS); L 0–3	Irfan (PAK); W 3–0	3rd place, bronze medalist(s)
Muhammad Ashab Irfan	Men's	Bye	Karam (LIB); W 3–0	Al Nasfan (KSA); W 3–0	Chotrani (IND); W 3–1	Singh (IND); L 0–3	Zaman (PAK); L 0–3	3rd place, bronze medalist(s)
Mahnoor Ali	Women's	—N/a	Au Yeong (SGP); L 0–3	Did not advance				
Sana Bahadar	Women's	—N/a	Boushehrizadeh (IRI); L 2–3	Did not advance				

Doubles

Athlete	Event	Round of 32	Round of 16	Quarterfinals	Semi-finals	Final	Rank
Athlete	Event	Opposition Score	Opposition Score	Opposition Score	Opposition Score	Opposition Score	Rank
Sehrish Ali; Nasir Iqbal	Mixed	Bye	Lee / Tang (HKG); L 0–2	Did not advance			
Mehwish Ali; Asim Khan	Mixed	Bhlon / Simha (NEP); W 2–0	Hayashi / Sano (JPN); W 2–1	Tse / Lai (HKG); L 0–2	Did not advance		

Team

Athlete	Event	Group stage				3rd RR Playoff			Quarter-finals	Semi-finals	Final	Rank
Athlete	Event	Opposition Score	Opposition Score	Opposition Score	Rank	Opposition Score	Opposition Score	Rank	Opposition Score	Opposition Score	Opposition Score	Rank
Nasir Iqbal; Muhammad Ashab Irfan; Asim Khan; Noor Zaman	Men	Philippines (PHI); W 3–0	Kuwait (KUW); W 3–0	—N/a	1 Q	Bye			South Korea (KOR); W 2–0	Hong Kong (HKG); W 2–1	Malaysia (MAS); L 0–2	2nd place, silver medalist(s)
Mahnoor Ali; Mehwish Ali; Sehrish Ali; Sana Bahadar	Women	Hong Kong (HKG); L 0–3	Mongolia (MGL); W 3–0	South Korea (KOR); L 0–3	3 PO	Macau (MAC); L 0–3	China (CHN); L 1–2	3	Did not advance			

== Swimming ==
Athlete	Event	Heats		Final	
Athlete	Event	Time	Rank	Time	Rank
Hamza Asif	Men's 50 m freestyle	24.04	30	Did not advance	
Hamza Asif	Men's 100 m freestyle	53.97	35	Did not advance	
Hamza Asif	Men's 50 m breaststroke	30.47	35	Did not advance	
Hamza Asif	Men's 50 m butterfly	26.37	36	Did not advance	
Mishael Aisha Hyat Ayub	Women's 50 m freestyle	30.04	30	Did not advance	
Mishael Aisha Hyat Ayub	Women's 50 m butterfly	30.95	25	Did not advance	
Mishael Aisha Hyat Ayub	Women's 50 m breaststroke	37.02	24	Did not advance	
Hareem Malik	Women's 50 m breaststroke	36.52	22	Did not advance	
Hareem Malik	Women's 100 m breaststroke	1:21.12	22	Did not advance	

== Table tennis ==
Athlete	Event	Round of 64	Round of 32	Round of 16	Quarterfinal	Semi-final	Final	
Athlete	Event	Opposition Score	Opposition Score	Opposition Score	Opposition Score	Opposition Score	Opposition Score	Rank
Bilal Taha	Men's singles	Rashed (BRN); L 0–4	Did not advance					
Muhammad Khan	Men's singles	Preechayan (THA); L 0–4	Did not advance					
Kalsoom Khan	Women's singles	Zaza (SYR); L 0–4	Did not advance					
Bilal Taha; Abdal Muhammad Khan	Men's doubles	Alaali / Mahfood (BRN); L 0–3	Did not advance					
Abbas Amjad Khan; Muhammad Khan	Men's doubles	Alamian / Alamian (IRI); L 0–3	Did not advance					
Aleena Khan; Fatima Khan	Women's doubles	Song / Choe (PRK); L 0–3	Did not advance					
Muhammad Khan; Kalsoom Khan	Mixed doubles	Maharjan / Thapa (NEP); L 0–3	Did not advance					

Team

Athlete	Event	Preliminary Round				Round of 16	Quarterfinal	Semi-final	Final	
Athlete	Event	Opposition Score	Opposition Score	Opposition Score	Rank	Opposition Score	Opposition Score	Opposition Score	Opposition Score	Rank
Bilal Taha; Abbas Amjad Khan; Abdal Muhammad Khan; Muhammad Shah Khan; Muhammad Taimur Khan	Men	Iran; L 0–3	Indonesia; L 0–3	India; L 0–3	4	Did not advance				
Nosheen Aslam; Aleena Khan; Fatima Khan; Kalsoom Khan	Women	Singapore; L 0–3	Indonesia; L 0–3	India; L 0–3	4	Did not advance				

== Taekwondo ==
Athlete	Event	Round of 16	Quarterfinal	Semifinal	Final	
Athlete	Event	Opposition Score	Opposition Score	Opposition Score	Opposition Score	Rank
Shahzaib Khan	Men's 58 kg	Hong Trong (VIE); L 1–2	Did not advance			
Hamzah Omar Saeed	Men's +80 kg	Mercer (THA); L 0–2	Did not advance			

Athlete	Event	Semifinal		Final	
Athlete	Event	Score	Rank	Score	Rank
Ameer Hamza	Men's poomsae	8.0200	7	Did not advance	
Zena Sheraz	Women's Poomsae	6.8600	7	Did not advance	

== Tennis ==
Singles

Athlete	Event	Round of 64	Round of 32	Round of 16	Quarter-final	Semi-final	Final	Rank
Athlete	Event	Opposition Score	Opposition Score	Opposition Score	Opposition Score	Opposition Score	Opposition Score	Rank
Muzammil Murtaza	Men's singles	Al Mashni (KUW); L 3–6, 2–6	Did not advance					
Muhammad Shoaib	Men's singles	Bye	Fitriadi (INA); L 4–6 4–6	Did not advance				
Mahin Aftab Qureshi	Women's singles	—N/a	Cheapchandej (THA); L 1–6, 1–6	Did not advance				
Ushna Suhail	Women's singles	—N/a	Putinseva (KAZ); L 1–6, 0–6	Did not advance				

Doubles

Athlete	Event	Round of 32	Round of 16	Quarter-final	Semi-final	Final	Rank
Athlete	Event	Opposition Score	Opposition Score	Opposition Score	Opposition Score	Opposition Score	Rank
Aqeel Khan; Muhammad Shoaib	Men's doubles	Davaadash / Enkhjargal (MGL); W 6–2, 6–0	Ho / Hsu (TPE); L 3–6 2–6	Did not advance			
Aisam-ul-Haq Qureshi; Muzammil Murtaza	Men's doubles	Hong / Kwon (KOR); L 5–7, 4–6	Did not advance				
Mahin Aftab Qureshi; Ushna Suhail	Women's doubles	Chogsomjav / Chogsomjav (MGL); L 1–6 0–6	Did not advance				
Aqeel Khan; Ushna Suhail	Mixed doubles	Zhukayev / Kulambayeva (KAZ); L 2–6 1–6	Did not advance				
Aisam-ul-Haq Qureshi; Mahin Aftab Qureshi	Mixed doubles	Shevchenko / Danilina (KAZ); L 3–6 5–7	Did not advance				

== Triathlon ==
Individual

Athlete	Event	Time						Rank
Athlete	Event	Swim (0.75 km)	Trans 1	Bike (20 km)	Trans 2	Run (5 km)	Total	Rank
Ali Hassan	Men	20:11	LAP					
Mohid Sadiq Lone	Men	10:43	12:08	1:01:33	LAP			
Sana Arif	Women	17:34	18:48	LAP				

Relay

Athlete	Event	Time						Rank
Athlete	Event	Swim (300 m)	Trans 1	Bike (6.6 km)	Trans 2	Run (1 km)	Total	Rank
Anisha	Mixed	8:38	1:49	14:56	0:25	12:35	38:23	—N/a
Muhammad Mustaghis Noor	Mixed	6:53	1:16	13:30	0:23	10:22	32:24	—N/a
Sana Arif	Mixed	8:18	1:29	14:41	0:27	12:45	37:40	—N/a
Ali Hassan	Mixed	8:25	DNF					—N/a
Total	Mixed	—N/a					DNF	

Key

- LAP: Lapped

== Volleyball ==
Pakistan's volleyball team secured its first Asian Games medal in 64 years, having last won bronze at the 1962 Jakarta Games.

Summary

Team	Event	Group stage				Quarterfinal	Semifinal	Final / BM	
Team	Event	Opposition Score	Opposition Score	Opposition Score	Rank	Opposition Score	Opposition Score	Opposition Score	Rank
Pakistan men's	Men's tournament	Kazakhstan; W 3–1	Uzbekistan; W 3–0	Japan; L 0–3	2 Q	India; W 3–0	Iran; L 0–3	China; W 3–0	3rd place, bronze medalist(s)

Men's tournament

Squad

- Abu Bakar Siddique
- Afaq Khan
- Muhammad Yahya
- Murad Khan
- Fahad Raza
- Hamid Yazman
- Jabran
- Muhammad Hamad
- Murad Jehan
- Musawer Khan
- Khizar Hayat
- Usman Faryad Ali

Pool A

Pos	Team	Pld	W	L	Pts	SW	SL	SR	SPW	SPL	SPR	Qualification
1	Japan (H)	3	3	0	9	9	0	MAX	229	173	1.324	Quarterfinals
2	Pakistan	3	2	1	6	6	4	1.500	236	218	1.083	Quarterfinals
3	Kazakhstan	3	1	2	3	4	7	0.571	221	253	0.874	Classification 9th–16th
4	Uzbekistan	3	0	3	0	1	9	0.111	196	238	0.824	Classification 9th–16th

Source: asiangames2026.org
Rules for classification: Tiebreakers
(H) Host

Date	Time	Venue		Score		Set 1	Set 2	Set 3	Set 4	Set 5	Total	Report
27 Sep	13:00	Okazaki	Pakistan	3–1	Kazakhstan	25–16	25–22	17–25	25–20		92–83	Report
28 Sep	13:00	Okazaki	Pakistan	3–0	Uzbekistan	25–18	25–18	25–20			75–56	Report
29 Sep	19:20	Okazaki	Pakistan	0–3	Japan	27–29	20–25	22–25			69–79	Report

Quarterfinal

Date	Time	Venue		Score		Set 1	Set 2	Set 3	Set 4	Set 5	Total	Report
1 Oct	10:00	Okazaki	Pakistan	3–0	India	25–19	25–23	25–18			75–60	Report

Semifinal

Date	Time	Venue		Score		Set 1	Set 2	Set 3	Set 4	Set 5	Total	Report
2 Oct	16:00	Okazaki	Pakistan	0–3	Iran	13–25	15–25	11–25			39–75	Report

Bronze medal match

Date	Time	Venue		Score		Set 1	Set 2	Set 3	Set 4	Set 5	Total	Report
3 Oct	16:00	Okazaki	Pakistan	3–0	China	25–18	25–16	25–18			75–52	Report

== Wrestling ==
Pakistan entered four wrestlers.

Men's Freestyle

Wrestler	Event	Round of 32	Round of 16	Quarter-final	Semi-final	Repechage	Final / BM	Rank
Wrestler	Event	Opposition Result	Opposition Result	Opposition Result	Opposition Result	Opposition Result	Opposition Result	Rank
Muhammad Abdullah	65 kg	Kim (PRK); L 2–13^{VSU1}	Did not advance					
Inayat Ullah	74 kg	—N/a	Kaipanov (KAZ); L 2–12^{VSU1}	Did not advance				
Nouman Zaka	86 kg	—N/a	Heng (CAM); W 10–4^{VFA}	Ishiguro (JPN); L 0–10^{VSU}	Did not Advance	Dauletbekov (KAZ); L 0–10^{VSU}	Did not advance	
Muhammad Gulzar	97 kg	—N/a	Azarpira (IRI); L 0–10^{VSU}	Did not Advance		Hemelyayev (TJK); L 0–12^{VSU}	Did not advance	

Key:

- W – Win
- L – Loss
- VFA – Victory by Fall
- VPO – Victory by Points – without any point scored by opponent
- VPO1 – Victory by Points – with point(s) scored by opponent
- VSU – Victory by technical superiority – without any point scored by the opponent
- VSU1 – Victory by technical superiority – with point(s) scored by the opponent

== Wushu ==
Taolu

Athlete	Event	Event 1		Event 2		Total	Rank
Athlete	Event	Result	Rank	Result	Rank	Total	Rank
Komal Emmanuel	Women's taijiquan & taijijian	DNS					

Sanda

Athlete	Event	Round of 16	Quarter-finals	Semi-finals	Final	
Athlete	Event	Opposition Result	Opposition Result	Opposition Result	Opposition Result	Rank
Amin Ullah	Men's –56 kg	Bye	Dinh (VIE); L 0–2	Did not advance		
Sadam Hussain	Men's –70 kg	Jang (KOR); L 0–2	Did not advance			
Zaib Hasnain	Men's –75 kg	Mirzodalerkhan (TJK); L 0–2	Did not advance			
