= Soft tennis at the 2026 Asian Games – Men's singles =

Men's singles at the 2026 Asian Games
- Venue: Higashiyama Park Tennis Center
- Dates: 22–23 September 2026
- Competitors: 22 from 11 nations

Medalists
gold medal	Toshiki Uematsu	Japan
silver medal	Takuya Kurosaka	Japan
bronze medal	Chen Po-yi	Chinese Taipei
bronze medal	Jay Meena	India

The men's singles soft tennis event is part of the soft tennis programme and took place from 22 to 23 September 2026, at the Higashiyama Park Tennis Center, in Nagoya, Aichi Prefecture.

== Schedule ==
All times are Japan Standard Time (UTC+09:00)

Date	Time	Event
Tuesday, 22 September 2026	09:00	Preliminary round
Wednesday, 23 September 2026	09:00	Quarterfinals
Wednesday, 23 September 2026	12:00	Semifinals
Wednesday, 23 September 2026	15:45	Final

== Results ==
=== Preliminary round ===
==== Group A ====
Pos	Player	Pld	W	L	GF	GA	GD	Qualification
1	Toshiki Uematsu (JPN)	3	3	0	12	2	+10	Quarterfinals
2	Tio Hutauruk (INA)	3	2	1	10	6	+4	
3	Samsocheaphearun Doeum (CAM)	3	1	2	6	8	−2	
4	Muhammad Ali (PAK)	3	0	3	0	12	−12	

Source: AG2026

	Score		Game						
	Score		1	2	3	4	5	6	7
Toshiki Uematsu (JPN)	4–0	Samsocheaphearun Doeum (CAM)	4–0	4–0	4–1	4–0			
Tio Hutauruk (INA)	4–0	Muhammad Ali (PAK)	4–0	4–0	4–0	4–0			
Toshiki Uematsu (JPN)	4–2	Tio Hutauruk (INA)	4–1	4–2	3–5	1–4	5–3	4–2	
Samsocheaphearun Doeum (CAM)	4–0	Muhammad Ali (PAK)	4–0	4–2	4–2	4–1			
Toshiki Uematsu (JPN)	4–0	Muhammad Ali (PAK)	4–0	4–1	4–1	4–2			
Samsocheaphearun Doeum (CAM)	2–4	Tio Hutauruk (INA)	2–4	0–4	4–2	1–4	4–2	2–4	

==== Group B ====
Pos	Player	Pld	W	L	GF	GA	GD	Qualification
1	Lee Haneul (KOR)	2	2	0	8	1	+7	Quarterfinals
2	Joseph Arcilla (PHI)	2	1	1	5	4	+1	
3	Pradip Khatri (NEP)	2	0	2	0	8	−8	

Source: AG2026

	Score		Game						
	Score		1	2	3	4	5	6	7
Joseph Arcilla (PHI)	4–0	Pradip Khatri (NEP)	4–0	5–2	4–2	5–3			
Pradip Khatri (NEP)	0–4	Lee Haneul (KOR)	0–4	0–4	0–4	2–4			
Joseph Arcilla (PHI)	1–4	Lee Haneul (KOR)	1–4	4–2	2–4	3–5	0–4		

==== Group C ====
Pos	Player	Pld	W	L	GF	GA	GD	Qualification
1	Chen Po-yi (TPE)	2	2	0	8	0	+8	Quarterfinals
2	Aryan Thakur (IND)	2	1	1	4	4	0	
3	Bold-erdene Altangerel (MGL)	2	0	2	0	8	−8	

Source: AG2026

	Score		Game						
	Score		1	2	3	4	5	6	7
Chen Po-yi (TPE)	4–0	Bold-erdene Altangerel (MGL)	4–0	4–1	5–3	4–1			
Bold-erdene Altangerel (MGL)	0–4	Aryan Thakur (IND)	0–4	1–4	1–4	0–4			
Chen Po-yi (TPE)	4–0	Aryan Thakur (IND)	4–0	4–1	4–2	4–1			

==== Group D ====
Pos	Player	Pld	W	L	GF	GA	GD	Qualification
1	Jay Meena (IND)	1	1	0	4	0	+4	Quarterfinals
2	Hussain Arain (PAK)	1	0	1	0	4	−4	

Source: AG2026

	Score		Game						
	Score		1	2	3	4	5	6	7
Jay Meena (IND)	4–0	Hussain Arain (PAK)	4–0	4–2	4–0	4–0			

==== Group E ====
Pos	Player	Pld	W	L	GF	GA	GD	Qualification
1	Sherwin Nuguit (PHI)	2	2	0	8	5	+3	Quarterfinals
2	Muhammad Falevi (INA)	2	1	1	7	4	+3	
3	Bekki Vongphakdy (LAO)	2	0	2	2	8	−6	

Source: AG2026

	Score		Game						
	Score		1	2	3	4	5	6	7
Muhammad Falevi (INA)	4–0	Bekki Vongphakdy (LAO)	4–0	4–0	4–2	4–1			
Bekki Vongphakdy (LAO)	2–4	Sherwin Nuguit (PHI)	6–8	5–3	4–2	1–4	1–4	2–4	
Muhammad Falevi (INA)	3–4	Sherwin Nuguit (PHI)	4–0	0–4	7–5	2–4	4–1	1–4	4–7

==== Group F ====
Pos	Player	Pld	W	L	GF	GA	GD	Qualification
1	Takuya Kurosaka (JPN)	3	3	0	12	4	+8	Quarterfinals
2	Kim Jin-woong (KOR)	3	2	1	11	4	+7	
3	Yi Keavirak (CAM)	3	1	2	4	10	−6	
4	Munkhtulga Bataa (MGL)	3	0	3	3	12	−9	

Source: AG2026

	Score		Game						
	Score		1	2	3	4	5	6	7
Kim Jin-woong (KOR)	4–0	Yi Keavirak (CAM)	4–0	4–2	4–0	4–1			
Munkhtulga Bataa (MGL)	1–4	Takuya Kurosaka (JPN)	1–4	4–1	0–4	2–4	0–4		
Kim Jin-woong (KOR)	4–0	Munkhtulga Bataa (MGL)	4–0	4–1	4–1	4–2			
Yi Keavirak (CAM)	0–4	Takuya Kurosaka (JPN)	1–4	3–5	4–6	1–4			
Yi Keavirak (CAM)	4–2	Munkhtulga Bataa (MGL)	4–2	3–5	4–2	5–7	4–2	4–1	
Kim Jin-woong (KOR)	3–4	Takuya Kurosaka (JPN)	4–2	2–4	2–4	2–4	5–3	4–1	8–10

==== Group G ====
Pos	Player	Pld	W	L	GF	GA	GD	Qualification
1	Chang Yu-sung (TPE)	2	2	0	8	0	+8	Quarterfinals
2	Kamal Bhandari (NEP)	2	1	1	4	7	−3	
3	Phatthana Louangsisombath (LAO)	2	0	2	3	8	−5	

Source: AG2026

	Score		Game						
	Score		1	2	3	4	5	6	7
Chang Yu-sung (TPE)	4–0	Kamal Bhandari (NEP)	4–0	4–1	4–1	6–4			
Kamal Bhandari (NEP)	4–3	Phatthana Louangsisombath (LAO)	2–4	1–4	5–3	0–4	4–1	5–3	7–3
Chang Yu-sung (TPE)	4–0	Phatthana Louangsisombath (LAO)	4–0	4–0	4–1	5–3			

=== Knockout round ===
Quarterfinals
A1	Toshiki Uematsu (JPN)
BYE
B1	Lee Ha-neul (KOR)	1	4	1	4	1	4
C1	Chen Po-yi (TPE)	4	0	4	2	4	6
D1	Jay Meena (IND)	0	4	2	4	5	2	7
E1	Sherwin Nuguit (PHI)	4	2	4	2	3	4	5
F1	Takuya Kurosaka (JPN)	4	7	4	5	5	4
G1	Chang Yu-sung (TPE)	1	9	6	3	3	2

Semifinals
A1	Toshiki Uematsu (JPN)	2	4	7	6	1	6
C1	Chen Po-yi (TPE)	4	1	5	4	4	4
D1	Jay Meena (IND)	3	1	1	4	6	1
F1	Takuya Kurosaka (JPN)	5	4	4	1	4	4

Final
A1	Toshiki Uematsu (JPN)	5	6	1	3	4	4	7
F1	Takuya Kurosaka (JPN)	3	4	4	5	1	6	2
