= Tajikistan at the 2026 Asian Games =

- IOC code: TJK
- NOC: National Olympic Committee of the Republic of Tajikistan

in Aichi–Nagoya, Japan September 19 – October 4, 2026
- Competitors: 102 in 21 sports
- Flag bearer: Mijgona Samadova
- Medals Ranked 22nd: Gold 2 Silver 5 Bronze 9 Total 16

Asian Games appearances (overview)
- 1994; 1998; 2002; 2006; 2010; 2014; 2018; 2022; 2026

Tajikistan competed at the 2026 Asian Games in Aichi Prefecture and Nagoya, Japan from September 19 to October 4, 2026. This marked Tajikistan's ninth appearance at the Asian Games. The country won 16 medals (2 gold, 5 silver and 9 bronze), ranking 22nd in the medal total.

Boxer Mijgona Samadova was the country's opening ceremony flagbearer.

== Medalists ==
The following athletes from Tajikistan won medals at the Games.

=== Gold ===
| No. | Medal | Name | Sport | Event | Date |
|---|---|---|---|---|---|
| 1 | Gold | Mirzobek Umarov | Mixed martial arts | Men's modern 60 kg | 22 September |
| 2 | Gold | Otabek Rajabov | Mixed martial arts | Men's traditional 65 kg | 22 September |

=== Silver ===
| No. | Medal | Name | Sport | Event | Date |
|---|---|---|---|---|---|
| 1 | Silver | Behruz Khurshedzoda | Mixed martial arts | Men's modern 71 kg | 22 September |
| 2 | Silver | Shakarmamad Mirmamadov | Kurash | Men's +90 kg | 27 September |

=== Bronze ===
| No. | Medal | Name | Sport | Event | Date |
|---|---|---|---|---|---|
| 1 | Bronze | Makhsatullo Muminov | Karate | Men's kumite 55 kg | 20 September |
| 2 | Bronze | Sarvar Abdushukurov | Kurash | Men's -66 kg | 27 September |

== Competitors ==
The following is a list of the number of competitors representing Tajikistan that will participate at the Asian Games:

| Sport | Men | Women | Total |
|---|---|---|---|
| Archery | 3 | 0 | 3 |
| Athletics | 3 | 0 | 3 |
| Badminton | 2 | 0 | 2 |
| Boxing | 6 | 4 | 10 |
| Breaking | 2 | 2 | 4 |
| Canoeing | 2 | 0 | 2 |
| Esports | 3 | 0 | 3 |
| Fencing | 1 | 0 | 1 |
| Gymnastics | 1 | 0 | 1 |
| Judo | 7 | 2 | 9 |
| Ju-jitsu | 7 | 1 | 8 |
| Karate | 3 | 0 | 3 |
| Kurash | 3 | 1 | 4 |
| Mixed martial arts | 3 | 0 | 3 |
| Shooting | 3 | 4 | 7 |
| Swimming | 9 | 2 | 11 |
| Taewondo | 2 | 0 | 2 |
| Tennis | 6 | 5 | 11 |
| Weightlifting | 1 | 0 | 1 |
| Wrestling | 9 | 1 | 10 |
| Wushu | 4 | 0 | 4 |
| Total | 80 | 22 | 102 |

== Karate ==
| Athlete | Event | Round of 32 | Round of 16 | Quarterfinals | Semifinals | Repechage | Final / BM | |
| Athlete | Event | Opposition Result | Opposition Result | Opposition Result | Opposition Result | Opposition Result | Opposition Result | Rank |
|---|---|---|---|---|---|---|---|---|
| Makhsatullo Muminov | Men's –55 kg | —N/a | Bye | Bigabyl (KAZ); L 0–7 | Did not advance | —N/a | Januar (INA); W 8–0 | 3rd place, bronze medalist(s) |
| Muhammad Mirzozoda | Men's –60 kg | Bye | Hashimoto (JPN); W 3–0 | Tamang (NEP); L 0–2 | Did not advance | | | |
| Alisher Sultonov | Men's –67 kg | Shih C-c (TPE); L 3–4 | Did not advance | | | | | |

== Mixed martial arts ==
| Athlete | Event | Round of 16 | Quarterfinals | Semifinals | Final | |
| Athlete | Event | Opposition Score | Opposition Score | Opposition Score | Opposition Score | Rank |
|---|---|---|---|---|---|---|
| Mirzobek Umarov | Men's 60 kg | Bye | Chang L. (TPE); W 3–0 | Khan (PAK); W 3–0 | Atamuratov (UZB); W 3–0 | 1st place, gold medalist(s) |
| Otabek Rajabov | Men's 65 kg | Bye | Adilov (KAZ); W 3–0 | Nasriddinov (UZB); W DSQ | Saclag (PHI); W 3–0 | 1st place, gold medalist(s) |
| Behruz Khurshedzoda | Men's 71 kg | Janhom (THA); W 3–0 | Nassar (JOR); W 1–0 DSQ | Duisheev (KGZ); W 3–0 | Shinbayev (KAZ); L 0–3 | 2nd place, silver medalist(s) |

== Shooting ==
Men

| Athlete | Event | Qualification | | Final | |
| Athlete | Event | Points | Rank | Points | Rank |
|---|---|---|---|---|---|
| David Oripov | 10 m air pistol | 556-20x | 54 | Did not advance | |
| Mehron Khojaev | 10 m air pistol | 546-13x | 43 | Did not advance | |
| Siyovush Panjsheri | 10 m air rifle | 604.6 | 44 | Did not advance | |

Women

| Athlete | Event | Qualification | | Final | |
| Athlete | Event | Points | Rank | Points | Rank |
|---|---|---|---|---|---|
| Anastasiya Lysykh | 10 m air pistol | 532-5x | 53 | Did not advance | |
| Shirinbibi Rajabova | 10 m air pistol | 550-6x | 47 | Did not advance | |
| Anora Lagutenko | 10 m air rifle | 617.9 | 47 | Did not advance | |
| Malika Lagutenko | 10 m air rifle | 623.9 | 30 | Did not advance | |

Mixed team

| Athlete | Event | Qualification | | Final | |
| Athlete | Event | Points | Rank | Points | Rank |
|---|---|---|---|---|---|
| David Oripov; Shirinbibi Rajabova | 10 m air pistol | 556-17x | 21 | Did not advance | |
| Anora Lagutenko; Siyovush Panjsheri | 10 m air rifle | 608.1 | 15 | Did not advance | |

== Wushu ==
=== Sanda ===
| Athlete | Event | Round of 16 | Quarter-finals | Semi-finals | Final | |
| Athlete | Event | Opposition Score | Opposition Score | Opposition Score | Opposition Score | Rank |
|---|---|---|---|---|---|---|
| Rustam Saidov | Men's –56 kg | Erdenebayar (MGL); L 0–2 | Did not advance | | | |
| Bakhtiyor Shafoatov | Men's –65 kg | Alipio (PHI); L 0–2 | Did not advance | | | |
| Anushervon Kamolzoda | Men's –70 kg | Jumanta (INA); L 0–2 | Did not advance | | | |
| Mirzodalerkhon Khurshedzoda | Men's –75 kg | Hasnain (PAK); W 2–0 | Zhang H-y (TPE); 0–2 | Did not advance | | |
