= Kim Hyung-soo =

Kim Hyung-soo may refer to:

- K.Will (born Kim Hyung-soo, 1981), South Korean ballad singer-songwriter
- Lee Wan (born Kim Hyung-soo, 1984), South Korean actor
- Brother Su (born Kim Hyungsoo, 1990), South Korean singer-songwriter
- Kim Hyung-su, magistrate of Yeongdeungpo District

== See also ==
- Kim Hyun-soo (disambiguation)
