= University of the Cordilleras =

Private university in Benguet, Philippines

- Unibersidad ng mga Kordilyera (Filipino)
- University crest
- Former names: Baguio Colleges (1946–1966); Baguio Colleges Foundation (1966–2003)
- Motto: A Beacon of Higher Education Beaming from these Majestic Mountain Highlands...
- Type: Private Non-sectarian Non-profit Coeducational Basic and Higher education institution
- Established: June 19, 1946 (80 years)
- Founders: Benjamin R. Salvosa; Evangelina D. Salvosa
- Academic affiliations: PAASCU; PACUCOA; ASAIHL; FAAP; PACU
- Chairman: Ray Dean D. Salvosa
- President: Nancy M. Flores
- Vice-president: Ariel Nimo B. Pumecha (VP for Academics and Research); Rhodora A. Ngolob (VP for Administration and Academic Services); Linden Branscome S. Bowman III (VP for Finance); Ronaldo L. Pontanosa (Academic Director, Integrated School)
- Dean: Renato S. Rondez; (Dean, College of Law); Jasmin May P. Baniaga; (Dean, College of Accountancy); Durezza D. Basil; (OIC-Dean, College of Arts & Sciences); Nolan L. Guillao; (Dean, College of Business Administration); Robino D. Cawi; (Dean, College of Criminal Justice Education); Nelson, G. Notarte; (OIC-Dean, College of Engineering & Architecture); Michelle G. Mamaril; (Dean, College of Hospitality & Tourism Management); Jeffrey S. Ingosan; (Dean, College of Information Technology & Computer Science); Judith Odanee G. Magwilang; (Dean, College of Nursing); Ramir S. Austria; (Dean, College of Teacher Education)
- Students: 21,000 Tertiary (2018)
- Location: Gov. Pack Rd., Baguio, Benguet, Philippines; 16°24′30″N 120°35′53″E
- Newspaper: The Alternative
- Colors: Forest Green
- Nicknames: UC Jaguars (formerly BCF Shields)
- Sporting affiliations: BBEAL
- Website: www.uc-bcf.edu.ph
- Location in Luzon Location in the Philippines

The University of the Cordilleras (UC or UC-BCF; Filipino: Unibersidad ng Kordilyeras), formerly known as the Baguio Colleges Foundation (BCF), is a private coeducational university in Baguio, Philippines. Founded by Benjamin R. Salvosa and his wife Evangelina D. Salvosa in 1946, it offers programs at the elementary, secondary, undergraduate and graduate levels catering to around 21,000 students.

It has three campuses all located in Baguio. The main campus is at the city center, near the Baguio Cathedral and SM City Baguio. It has an autonomous status granted by the Commission on Higher Education (CHED) and is an ISO certified university. The university's alumni include two Philippine Bar Examination topnotchers (first placers) and has graduated the founder and several members of Team Lakay Wushu. The university's athletics team is nicknamed UC Jaguars.

== History ==
=== Founding ===
Baguio Colleges was founded on June 19, 1946, by Atty. Benjamin R. Salvosa and his wife Evangelina D. Salvosa. It was the first higher learning institution in the highland city of Baguio established after World War II. The college started with 156 students in teacher training and liberal arts, establishing the College of Liberal Art and College of Education. Baguio Colleges rented spaces in the Arevalo and the Antipolo buildings and later moved to the Lopez and Limping buildings along Session Road.

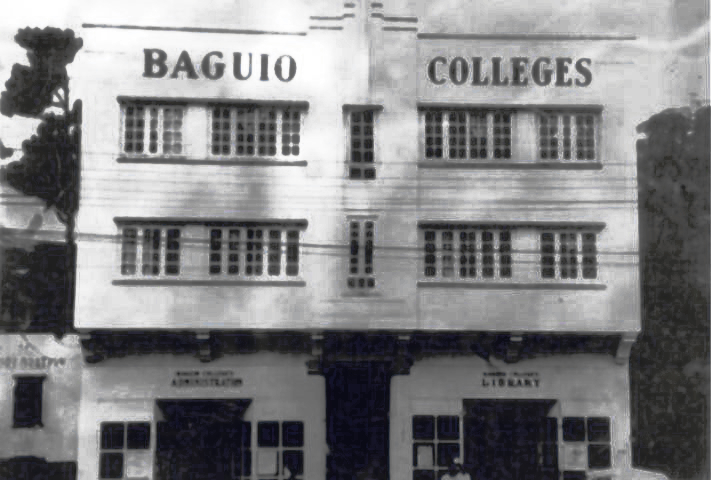
Antipolo Building along Session Road

The grade school department opened in 1946 and the high school department opened the following year. The growing population led to the construction of the campus along Hamada Road. When the buildings at the main campus at Governor Pack Road were finally completed, the grade school and high school department became a laboratory school.

The founder thought of a college for law which he would model after his alma mater, the University of the Philippines College of Law. It was the only institution offering law north of Manila when the College of Law opened in 1952. Until the seventies, the College of Law could not support itself and had to depend on subsidy from the school administration. For some time, the founder himself taught law and served as the first dean from 1952 to 1966.

The administration converted the college into a foundation as Baguio Colleges Foundation in 1966. The founder, Atty. Benjamin R. Salvosa, sat as the chairman of the board of trustees and remained as the president until the early part of 1994.

Baguio Colleges Foundation Building

=== Recent developments ===
On November 22, 2003, the school received university status and became the University of the Cordilleras (UC).

In 2009, the university created a master development plan for Baguio's historic and main park, Burnham Park and donated it to the city local government. The supposed master development plan was donated by the university when Baguio celebrated its centennial anniversary but was not approved due to the billion peso cost.

In 2019, Senator Richard Gordon said academic institutions such as the University of the Philippines, University of the Cordilleras and Philippine Military Academy could be relocated to Tuba, Benguet. The senator said it was intended to reduce congestion in Baguio, citing that one-third of the city population consisted of students.

== Campuses ==
Main Campus

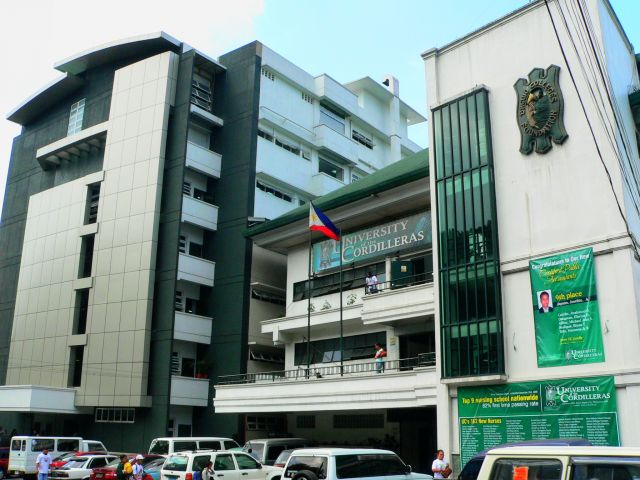
Main Campus

Legarda Campus

Campo Libertad

The university has three campuses in Baguio, which include: the main campus located at Governor Pack Road; the Legarda campus; and Campo Libertad located at Hamada Road. The main campus is at the city center, near Our Lady of Atonement Church (the Baguio Cathedral) and SM City Baguio. The campus houses Kalilayan, a museum made in commemoration of the founders. The museum was inaugurated on April 20, 2015. Campo Libertad houses the university's grade school and junior high school. On October 27, 2016, the campus was renamed to Campo Libertad in honor of Dr. Libertad D. Quetulio who served as Executive Dean and Trustee of Baguio Colleges from 1946 to 1966 and Baguio Colleges Foundation from 1966 to 1969.

== Organization and administration ==
The administration includes the board of trustees, executive council, academic council and administrative council. The board of trustees consists of the chairman and vice-chairman in addition to four board members. The chairman of the board of trustees is Jesus Benjamin D. Salvosa. The academic council consists of the deans of the different colleges, the academic director of the integrated school and the principals for the Senior High School and Grade School & Junior High School.

University of the Cordilleras is an accredited member of national and international organizations:

- Philippine Accrediting Association of Schools, Colleges and Universities (PAASCU)
- Philippine Association of Colleges and Universities Commission on Accreditation (PACUCOA)
- Federation of Accrediting Agencies of the Philippines (FAAP)
- Philippine Association of Colleges and Universities (PACU)
- Baguio-Benguet Educational Athletic League (BBEAL)

== Academics ==
=== Colleges and Institutions ===
University of the Cordilleras
College / Institution	Founded
Law	1952
Accountancy	2001
Arts and Sciences	1946
Business Administration	1946
Criminal Justice	1986
Engineering and Architecture	1949
Hospitality and Tourism Management	2005
Information Technology and Computer Science	1986
Nursing	2003
Teacher Education	1946
Senior High School	2016
Junior High School	1947
Grade School	1946

The university has 10 colleges, collectively offering over 40 certificate, tertiary, graduate, and post-graduate programs, including a laboratory school for pre-school, grade school and high school, catering to around 18,000 students from the Cordillera Administrative Region and other regions of the country and overseas representing 37 nationalities.

=== Accreditation and recognition ===
On May 16, 2010, the university received distinction through the commission's Institutional Quality Assurance through Monitoring and Evaluation (IQuAME) and was certified with all quality standards corresponding to Category A (teaching) or as a "Teaching University." On August 27, 2014, the university was ISO 9001:2008 certified.

In a memorandum order issued April 13, 2016, the university was granted the "Autonomous Status" by the Commission on Higher Education (CHED). In the same year, CHED awarded Center of Excellence status to three of its programs, namely: Information Technology, Criminology, and Teacher Education. In 2019, the university was ISO 9001:2015 certified.

=== Research ===
The Research and Development Center (RDC) was made operational on August 1, 1987, with the recommendation of the Philippine Accrediting Association of School, Colleges and Universities (PAASCU).

==== Publications ====
University of the Cordilleras publishes the following research journals:

- UC Research Journal (UCRJ), listed in Public Knowledge Project, a consortium of Simon Fraser University Library, the School of Education at Stanford University, and the Faculty of Education at the University of British Columbia in Canada.
- Enquerre, the research journal of the College of Arts and Sciences which features original researches in natural sciences, social sciences, language and communication. The name of the journal comes from an old French word which means to ask or to inquire.

==== Technology business incubator ====
The University of the Cordilleras Innovation and Nurturing Space (UCIANS) involves a technology business incubator (TBI) that focuses on the needed services of students in-school and outside campus as well as a geographic information system (GIS) Laboratory. The Technology Business Incubator Center serves to assist in the commercialization of research and intellectual property protection. UCIANS operates as a business incubator for startup companies and currently has 11 incubatees.

== Student life ==
=== Athletics ===
The UC Athletic Office serves as the center for sports development of university students and employees. The university's athletics team is the UC Jaguars. The university is a member of the Baguio-Benguet Educational Athletic League (BBEAL).

=== Performing Arts ===
The UC Center for Creative Productions (UC-CCP) is the performing arts center of the university. With UC students as performers and production staff, the center produces performances for the university and for the public. The four main groups are UC Dance Squad; UC Saeng ya Kasay Cultural Ensemble (formerly UC Hapiyoh Mi Cultural Group); UC Chorale; and UC Percussion and Orchestra.

=== Events ===
The UC Silew Awards is an annual event recognizing students, student organizations and advisers for exemplary and meritorious achievements and activities. The university recognizes individuals, organizations and programs in athletics, arts, leadership and community involvement.

=== Traditions ===
The founder Atty. Benjamin R. Salvosa had commissioned Dr. Rodolfo Cornejo to compose the hymn and march for the then Baguio Colleges.

== Notable people ==
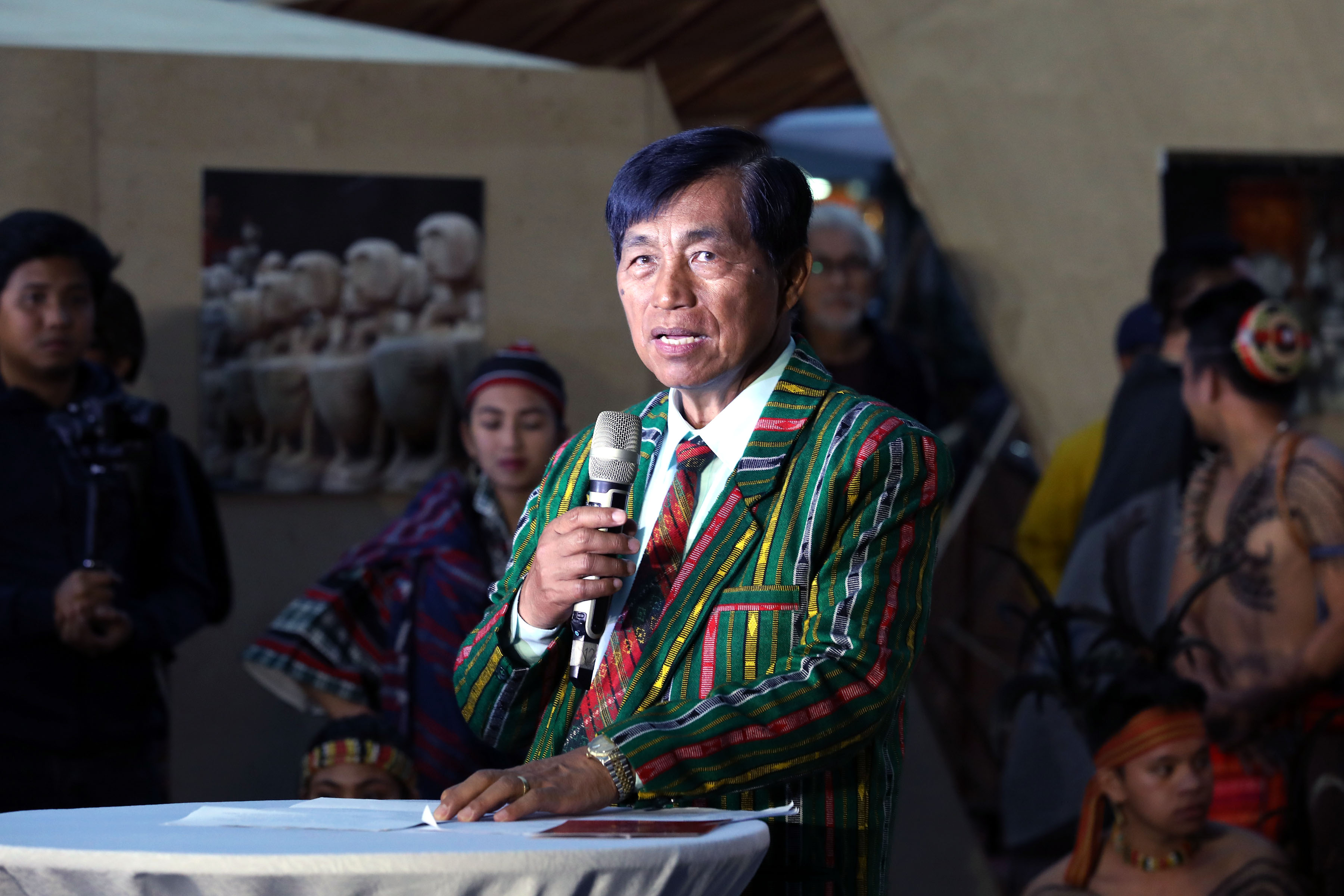
Mauricio Domogan, former mayor of Baguio, earned his Bachelor of Laws degree from then Baguio Colleges Foundation in 1973.

Alumni of the University of the Cordilleras include two Philippine Bar Examination topnotchers (first placers).

=== Alumni ===
- Janet B. Abuel (Bachelor of Laws (LL.B.), 1998) – 1st Placer of the 1998 Bar exam, former OIC Secretary of Department of Budget and Management
- David L. Almirol Jr. (Bachelor of Science (B.S.) in Computer Science, 2002) – CEO of MultiSys Technologies Corp.
- Honorato Y. Aquino (LL.B., 1962) – Representative of Baguio (1984–1986)
- Kevin Belingon – former ONE Bantamweight World Champion and Universal Reality Combat Championship (URCC) Flyweight Champion
- Mauricio Domogan (LL.B., 1973) – Former Mayor of Baguio (1992–2001; 2010–2019), Congressman (2001–2010)
- Eduard Folayang – former MMA Champion
- Noel Neil Malimban – 1st Placer of the 2006 Bar exam, Deputy Director of Bangko Sentral ng Pilipinas
- Faustino Olowan – Councilor (2001–2007), Incumbent Vice Mayor of Baguio
- Daniel Parantac – wushu athlete
- Jean Claude Saclag – Asiad and SEA Games medalist, MMA athlete
- Mark Sangiao – founder of Team Lakay
- Parul Shah (B.S. Nursing, 2012) – beauty queen, Miss Grand International 2015 3rd runner up, The Amazing Race Asia Season 5 winner
- Lorli D. Villanueva (B.A. English, 1968) – Multi-awarded actress, filmmaker, producer, author, educator
- Marilene Cabuena-Acosta (B.S. Commerce, 1981) – CEO of Pag-IBIG Fund, Inquirer Women of Power 2026
- Fernando Chan Laranang (Bachelor of Civil Engineering/Sanitary Engineering, 1983) – CEO of FCLaranang Group of Companies
- Brigadier General David K. Peredo Jr. (B.S. Information and Computer Science, 1990) – Regional Director of the Police Regional Office-Cordillera Administrative Region (PRO-CAR)
- Associate Justice Roberto Patdu Quiroz (LL.B., 1995) – Associate Justice of Court of Appeals[
- Geje Eustaquio (Bachelor of Secondary Education, 2008, Master of Arts in Education, 2016) – Professional Athlete, One Flyweight World Champion
- Adolfo Andrada (B.S. Criminology) – Outstanding Police Officers in Service(COPS) 2015, Medalya ng Katapangan, Medalya Sugatang Magiting
- Samuel B. Manzano (B.S. Criminology, 1991) – Brigadier General of Deputy Commander of the Reserve Command, Philippine Army (RESCOM, PA)
- Atty. Wilmark Javier Ramos (B.S. Business Administration, 2010) – VP for Administration of Tarlac State University, Multi Awarded researcher in consumer behavior and mobile banking

=== Faculty ===
- Romeo A. Brawner (Law Professor, 1971–1975) – former Commissioner of the Commission on Elections
