= Team Lakay Wushu =

Mixed martial arts training organization in Philippines

Team Lakay
- Est.: 2003; 22 years ago
- Founded by: Mark Sangiao
- Primary owners: Mark Sangiao; Eduard Folayang (Co-owner, until 2023)
- Primary trainers: Julio Agalatiw (Boxing); Mark Sangiao (Head Coach)
- Past titleholders: Eduard Folayang (ONE Lightweight Champion) Geje Eustaquio (ONE Flyweight Champion) Honorio Banario (ONE Featherweight Champion) Kevin Belingon (ONE Bantamweight Champion) Joshua Pacio (ONE Strawweight Champion)
- Training facilities: Benguet, Philippines
- Website: http://www.teamlakay.net

Team Lakay, is a martial arts group based in La Trinidad, Philippines. Officially named Lakay MMA Top Team, it is also known as Lakay Wushu or Lakay MMA. The group was founded in 2003 by mixed martial artist Marquez Sangiao. Sangiao was also head coach of the Cordillera chapter in Baguio for Wushu, and a seasoned martial artist with past experience in kickboxing, taekwondo, and Jiu-Jitsu as well as a martial arts instructor at the Philippine Military Academy (PMA) and a coach for Wushu at the University of the Cordilleras in Baguio City.

Team Lakay fighters use a distinctive style which has its roots in Wushu Sanshou. The success of fighters such as Eduard Folayang, Honorio Banario and Kevin Belingon has helped to establish a reputation in the MMA scene.

On October 26, 2011, it was announced that Team Lakay Wushu was to be a part of the ONE FC Network.

== Ultimate Fighting Championship ==
In 2013, Dave Galera became Team Lakay’s first athlete to compete in the UFC. Galera lost to Royston Wee at UFC Fight Night 34: Saffiedine vs. Lim and later he was released by the UFC. Mark Eddiva made his debut in The Ultimate Fighter China Finale: Kim vs. Hathaway against Jumabieke Tuerxun, he won via unanimous decision. Following year, Mark Eddiva will face Kevin Souza at The Ultimate Fighter Brazil 3 Finale: Miocic vs. Maldonado on May 31, 2014. Mark Eddiva lost via TKO punches in the second round.

At UFC Fight Night 43: Te Huna vs. Marquardt on June 28, 2014, Roldan Sangcha-an made his debut in Australia against Richie Vaculik, he lost via unanimous decision.

At UFC Fight Night 66: Edgar vs. Faber on May 16, 2015, Eddiva and Sangcha-an are now part in the preliminary card. Both Sangcha-an and Eddiva suffering devastating loss on the preliminary evening.

== Rich Franklin's ONE Warrior Series ==
Lito Adiwang faced Jose Huerta in ONE Warrior Series 3 on October 11, 2018. Lito Adiwang won via KO in the first round.

Lito Adiwang faced Alberto Correia in ONE Warrior Series 4 on February 28, 2019. Lito Adiwang won via TKO in the first round.

Lito Adiwang faced Anthony Do in ONE Warrior Series 7 on August 6, 2019. Lito Adiwang won via unanimous decision and bagged a contract with ONE Championship.

== Departure of fighters and establishment of Lions Nation MMA ==
In March 2023, former ONE Champions Eduard Folayang, Kevin Belingon, Joshua Pacio and Honorio Banario left Team Lakay. On June 24, it was announced that they had formed their own team, Lions Nation MMA.

== Notable Fighters ==
Current

- Geje Eustaquiao (Former ONE Flyweight Champion)
- Jhanlo Mark Sangiao (Mark Sangiao's son)
- Adonis Sevilleno
- Carlos Alvarez
- Carlo Von Bumina-ang
- Jean Claude Saclag

Former

- Eduard Folayang (Former ONE Championship Lightweight Champion, Former URCC Welterweight Champion)
- Joshua Pacio (ONE Championship Strawweight Champion)
- Kevin Belingon (Former ONE Championship Bantamweight Champion, Former URCC Flyweight Champion)
- Honorio Banario (Former ONE Championship Featherweight Champion)
- Stephen Loman (Former Brave Bantamweight Champion)
- Danny Kingad
- Edward Kelly
- Mark Eddiva
- Dave Galera (Former Universal Reality Combat Championship Interim Bantamweight Champion)
- Roldan Sangcha-an
- Harold Banario
- John Cris Corton
- Rey Docyogen (Former Universal Reality Combat Championship Pinweight Champion)
- Crisanto Pitpitunge (Former PXC Bantamweight Champion)
- Tristan Rebuyaco
- Jomar Pa-ac
- April Osenio
- Gina Iniong
- Jenelyn Olsim
- Jerry Olsim
- Jeremy Pacatiw
- Lito Adiwang

== See also ==
- List of Top Professional MMA Training Camps
