= Kevin Belingon =

Filipino martial artist

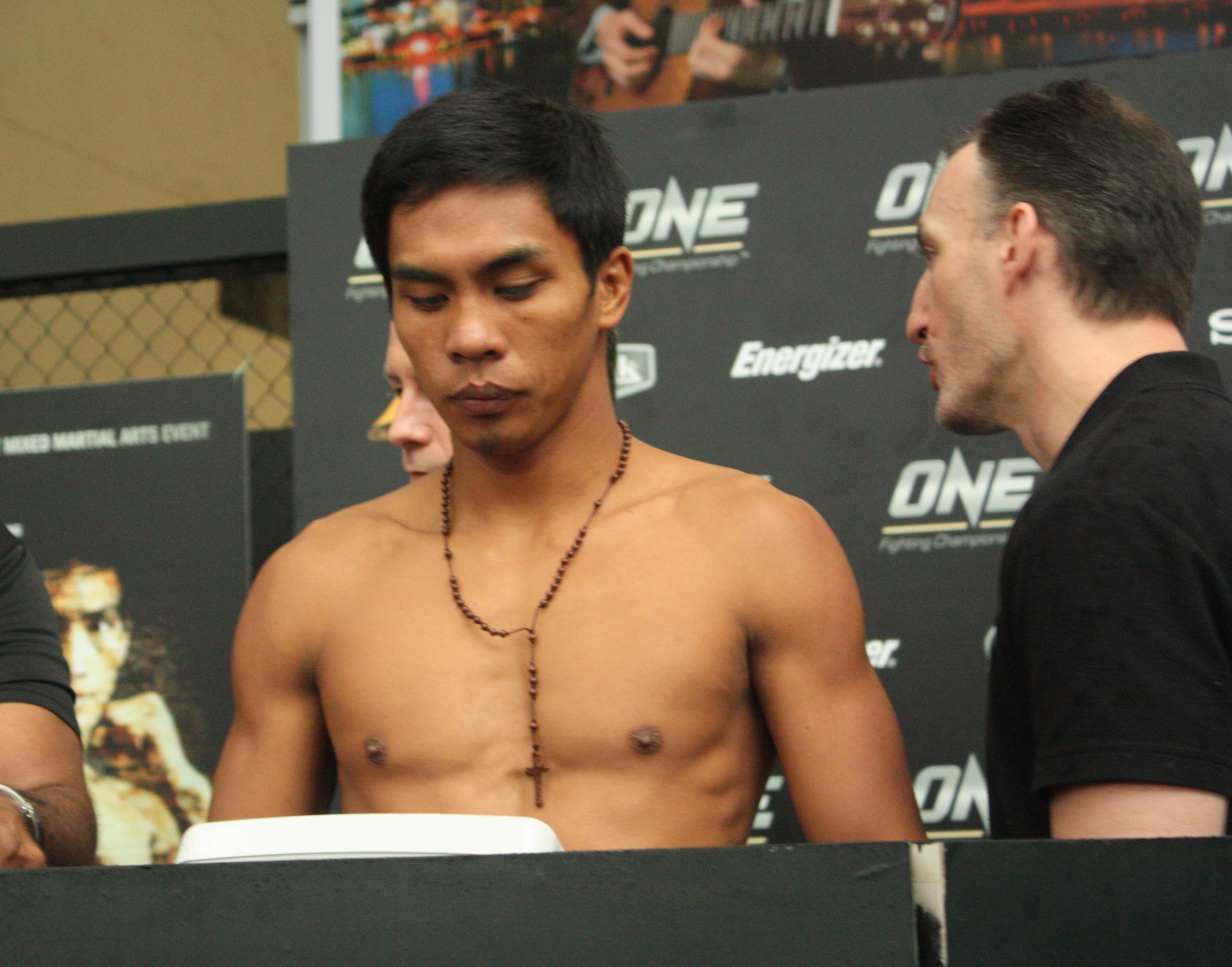
- Born: Kevin Indunan Belingon; October 30, 1987 (age 38); Kiangan, Ifugao, Philippines
- Other names: The Silencer
- Height: 5 ft 5 in (165 cm)
- Weight: 145 lb (66 kg; 10 st 5 lb)
- Division: Flyweight (2007–2008); Bantamweight (2008–2019); Featherweight (2019–present)
- Style: Sanda, Dumog
- Stance: Orthodox
- Fighting out of: Baguio, Philippines
- Team: Team Lakay (2007–2023); Lions Nation MMA (2023–Present)
- Rank: Black belt in Wushu; Blue belt in Brazilian jiu-jitsu under Gibran Langbayan
- Years active: 2007–present

Mixed martial arts record
- Total: 31
- Wins: 20
- By knockout: 8
- By submission: 3
- By decision: 9
- Losses: 11
- By knockout: 3
- By submission: 4
- By decision: 3
- By disqualification: 1

Other information
- University: University of the Cordilleras
- Mixed martial arts record from Sherdog
- Last updated on: April 1, 2019

Kevin Indunan Belingon (born October 30, 1987) is a Filipino mixed martial artist. He competed mostly with ONE Championship, where he was the former ONE Bantamweight World Champion and Universal Reality Combat Championship (URCC) Flyweight Champion.

== Early life and education ==
Belingon is of Igorot descent and hails from Kiangan, Ifugao, Philippines. In his early childhood he idolized and admired movie icon Bruce Lee, which then inspired him to practice martial arts. Belingon pursued his passion in martial arts at the age of 17 and was eventually awarded a wushu scholarship to the University of the Cordilleras. He had success in wushu competition, becoming a Philippines national champion. After finishing college, Belingon stayed in Baguio.

In Baguio, he began training at Team Lakay Wushu, one of the best MMA stables in the Philippines under famous Filipino coach Mark Sangiao. Although he earned a bachelor's degree in Criminology, he put his ambitions of pursuing a career in law enforcement on hold to focus full-time on being a professional Martial Artist.

He made his professional debut in 2007 and won his first nine bouts, capturing a flyweight title in the process after beating opponents from all across Asia. ONE Championship signed Belingon in 2012.

== Mixed martial arts career ==
=== Universal Reality Combat Championship ===
On June 30, 2007, Kevin Belingon made his professional debut in Universal Reality Combat Championship, at URCC 10. The event was held on June 30, 2007, at The Fort in Taguig, Metro Manila, Philippines. Also on the fight card was Belingon's teammate and future ONE Championship world champion, Eduard Folayang. The Ifugao warrior fought Richard Lasprilla for the URCC Flyweight Championship and won via Majority Decision in his first professional MMA fight.

=== Martial combat ===
After 5 fights exclusively in his home country Philippines, Belingon entered the Singapore-based promotion Martial Combat in May 2010 in his first international fight against Thailand Fighter Ngoo Ditty, and won via first round TKO.

=== Legend Fighting Championship ===
More than a month, after his fight in Martial Combat Promotions, he fought under the banner of Legend Fighting Championship MMA Promotions based in China. Winning against Nam Jin Jo of South Korea via Unanimous Decision in June 2010 and Dalai Bayin of China in round 1 Submission in September 2010.

=== Returning to the URCC ===
After his international fights in Hong Kong and Singapore, "The Silencer" returned home to compete at URCC 19: Collision in Pasay, Metro Manila on April 2, 2011, against fellow Filipino Isaac Tulinng. A head kick and combination of punches forced the referee to stop the contest, awarding Belingon the win via TKO.

=== ONE Championship ===
Belingon made his debut in the promotion against Masakazu Imanari at ONE Fighting Championship: War of the Lions March 2012. He submitted Belingon in the opening round via heel hook. Belingon also lost his next bout by unanimous decision against Korean Soo Chul Kim, who went on to become the inaugural ONE Bantamweight World Champion two months later.

After back-to-back defeats, Belingon entered the ONE Bantamweight Grand Prix Tournament and won back-to-back stoppages against Yusup Saadulaev, and Thanh Vu of Australia. He eventually lost against Masakatsu Ueda in the final round of ONE Bantamweight Grand Prix.

In January 2016, after a win against Koetsu Okazaki, he got the opportunity to challenge for the title against the champion, Bibiano Fernandes. He lost this title fight via Kimura in the first round.

His next victory came over Muin Gafurov in October 2016. Belingon followed it up with a pair of first round stoppages of former title contenders Toni Tauru, and Reece McLaren in 2017, before ending the year with a unanimous decision win against Kevin Chung.

On 20 April 2018, in the main event of ONE Championship: Heroes of Honor, Belingon faced off with another former title challenger Andrew Leone. Belingon dominated the first round until a spinning side-kick to the liver sent Leone to the canvas. The Filipino finished the fight with ground and pound.

On July 27, 2018, at ONE Championship: Reign of Kings, Belingon faced two-division ONE Championship title holder, Martin Nguyen. He defeated the Vietnamese-Australian by unanimous decision and became the ONE Championship Interim Bantamweight Champion.

Belingon faced reigning bantamweight champion Bibiano Fernandes at ONE Championship 78: Heart of the Lion on November 9, 2018, in a title unification bout and a rematch of their previous battle in 2016. Belingon won the fight via split decision to become the undisputed bantamweight champion, handing Fernandes his first loss in 8 years and ending the promotion's longest ever championship reign.

Belingon faced Fernandes in a trilogy match at ONE Championship: A New Era on March 30, 2019. The match ended with Belingon losing the bantamweight title via disqualification after landing an illegal elbow to the back of Fernandes' head.

Belingon faced Fernandes for the fourth time at ONE Championship: Century on October 13, 2019. He lost the fight via a rear-naked choke submission in the second round.

Belingon then faced John Lineker at ONE Championship: Inside the Matrix 3 on November 13, 2020. He lost the fight via second-round knockout.

Belingon faced Kwon Won Il at ONE: Winter Warriors II on December 17, 2021. He lost the bout via liver shot in the second round.

Belingon faced Kim Jae-woong on November 19, 2022, at ONE on Prime Video 4. He lost the fight via technical knockout in the first round.

After a two-years hiatus, Belingon faced Bibiano Fernandes on February 20, 2025, at ONE 171. He lost the fight via split decision.

== Personal life ==
Belingon and his wife have a daughter, Kelsey (born 2020).

== Championships and accomplishments ==
- ONE Championship
  - ONE Bantamweight World Championship (one time; former)
  - Interim ONE Bantamweight World Championship (one time; former)
- Universal Reality Combat Championship
  - URCC Flyweight Champion (one time; former)

== Mixed martial arts record ==
Professional record breakdown
31 matches	20 wins	11 losses
By knockout	10	3
By submission	2	4
By decision	8	3
By disqualification	0	1

Res.	Record	Opponent	Method	Event	Date	Round	Time	Location	Notes
Loss	20–11	Bibiano Fernandes	Decision (split)	ONE 171	February 20, 2025	3	5:00	Lusail, Qatar	
Loss	20–10	Kim Jae-woong	TKO (punches)	ONE on Prime Video 4	November 19, 2022	1	2:33	Kallang, Singapore	
Loss	20–9	Kwon Won-il	KO (punch to the body)	ONE: Winter Warriors II	December 17, 2021	2	0:52	Kallang, Singapore	
Loss	20–8	John Lineker	TKO (punches)	ONE: Inside the Matrix 3	November 13, 2020	2	1:16	Kallang, Singapore	
Loss	20–7	Bibiano Fernandes	Submission (rear-naked choke)	ONE: Century – Part 2	October 13, 2019	2	2:16	Tokyo, Japan	For the ONE Bantamweight Championship (145 lb).
Loss	20–6	Bibiano Fernandes	DQ (illegal elbows)	ONE: A New Era	March 31, 2019	3	3:40	Tokyo, Japan	Lost the ONE Bantamweight Championship (145 lb).
Win	20–5	Bibiano Fernandes	Decision (split)	ONE: Heart of the Lion	November 9, 2018	5	5:00	Kallang, Singapore	Won and unified the ONE Bantamweight Championship (145 lb).
Win	19–5	Martin Nguyen	Decision (unanimous)	ONE: Reign of Kings	July 27, 2018	5	5:00	Pasay, Philippines	Won the interim ONE Bantamweight Championship (145 lb).
Win	18–5	Andrew Leone	TKO (spinning back kick and punches)	ONE: Heroes of Honor	April 20, 2018	2	1:27	Pasay, Philippines	Featherweight debut.
Win	17–5	Kevin Chung	Decision (unanimous)	ONE: Legends of the World	November 10, 2017	3	5:00	Pasay, Philippines	
Win	16–5	Reece McLaren	KO (punches)	ONE: Quest for Greatness	August 18, 2017	1	1:02	Kuala Lumpur, Malaysia	
Win	15–5	Toni Tauru	TKO (submission to punches)	ONE: Kings of Dynasty	April 21, 2017	1	2:27	Pasay, Philippines	
Win	14–5	Muin Gafurov	Decision (unanimous)	ONE: Clash of Heroes	October 7, 2016	3	5:00	Yangon, Myanmar	
Loss	13–5	Bibiano Fernandes	Submission (kimura)	ONE: Dynasty of Champions 5	January 23, 2016	1	4:04	Changsha, China	For the ONE Bantamweight Championship.
Win	13–4	Koetsu Okazaki	Decision (unanimous)	ONE FC: Warrior's Way	December 5, 2014	3	5:00	Pasay, Philippines	
Loss	12–4	Kim Dae-hwan	Submission (rear-naked choke)	ONE FC: War of Nations	March 14, 2014	1	4:39	Kuala Lumpur, Malaysia	
Win	12–3	David Aranda Santacana	KO (punches)	ONE FC: Moment of Truth	December 6, 2013	1	2:53	Pasay, Philippines	
Loss	11–3	Masakatsu Ueda	Decision (unanimous)	ONE FC: Rise to Power	May 31, 2013	3	5:00	Pasay, Philippines	2013 ONE FC Bantamweight Grand Prix Final.
Win	11–2	Thanh Vu	TKO (punches)	ONE FC: Kings and Champions	April 5, 2013	2	1:00	Kallang, Singapore	2013 ONE FC Bantamweight Grand Prix Semifinal.
Win	10–2	Yusup Saadulaev	TKO (punches)	ONE FC: Rise of Kings	October 6, 2012	1	3:18	Kallang, Singapore	2013 ONE FC Bantamweight Grand Prix Quarterfinal.
Loss	9–2	Soo Chul Kim	Decision (unanimous)	ONE FC: Pride of Nation	August 31, 2012	3	5:00	Quezon City, Philippines	
Loss	9–1	Masakazu Imanari	Submission (reverse heel hook)	ONE FC: War of Lions	March 31, 2012	1	1:18	Kallang, Singapore	
Win	9–0	Isaac Tuling	TKO (head kick and punches)	URCC 19	April 2, 2011	1	6:25	Pasay, Philippines	
Win	8–0	Dalai Bayin	Submission (rear-naked choke)	Legend FC 3	September 24, 2010	1	4:40	Hong Kong, SAR, China	
Win	7–0	Jo Nam-jin	Decision (unanimous)	Legend FC 2	June 24, 2010	3	5:00	Hong Kong, SAR, China	
Win	6–0	Ngoo Ditty	TKO (punches)	Martial Combat 2	May 13, 2010	1	0:08	Sentosa, Singapore	
Win	5–0	Jilmar Tangayan	Decision (unanimous)	URCC: Rogue Magazine's Black The Brawl 2009	October 24, 2009	3	5:00	Makati, Philippines	
Win	4–0	Justin Cruz	Decision (unanimous)	URCC 13	March 28, 2009	2	10:00	Makati, Philippines	
Win	3–0	Magellan Perez	Submission (kimura)	URCC 12	November 22, 2008	1	0:15	Makati, Philippines	
Win	2–0	Roldan Cartajena	Submission (armbar)	URCC 11	November 25, 2007	1	8:42	Pasay, Philippines	
Win	1–0	Richard Lasprilla	Decision (majority)	URCC 10	June 30, 2007	2	20:00	Taguig, Philippines	Bantamweight debut.
