= Wushu at the 2026 Asian Games – Men's sanda 56 kg =

Men's sanda 56 kg at the 2026 Asian Games
- Venue: Aichi Budokan
- Dates: 21–24 September 2026
- Competitors: 12 from 12 nations

Medalists
| gold medal | Ou Jiaming | China |
| silver medal | Đinh Văn Tâm | Vietnam |
| bronze medal | Saydullo Abdurashitov | Uzbekistan |
| bronze medal | Fereddy Sinaga | Indonesia |

The men's sanda 56 kilograms competition at the 2026 Asian Games in Nagoya, Japan was held from 21 to 24 September 2026 at the Aichi Prefectural Martial Arts Hall.

Competition bouts consist of 3 rounds in total, each lasting two minutes with a one-minute rest period between rounds. The athlete who scores more points in each round is the winner of that rounds; the bout ends when one athlete has won two rounds (and thus the match).

A total of fifteen competitors from fifteen countries (NOCs) competed in this event, limited to fighters whose body weight was less than 56 kilograms. Ou Jiaming from China won the gold medal.

== Schedule ==
All times are Japan Standard Time (UTC+09:00)

| Date | Time | Event |
|---|---|---|
| Monday, 21 September 2026 | 18:00 | 1/8 finals |
| Tuesday, 22 September 2026 | 18:00 | Quarterfinals |
| Wednesday, 23 September 2026 | 18:00 | Semifinals |
| Thursday, 24 September 2026 | 09:30 | Final |

== Results ==
Legend

- KO — Won by knockout
- PD — Won by point difference

1/8 finals
Ou Jiaming (CHN) | PD
Rohit Chunaro (NEP)
Aryan Sood (IND) | 2
Shahzada Safi (AFG) | 0
Carlos Baylon (PHI) | 0
Đinh Văn Tâm (VIE) | 2
Rustam Saidov (TJK) | 0
Erdenebayaryn Enkhtüvshin (MGL) | 2

Quarterfinals
Shojib Hossain (BAN)
Ou Jiaming (CHN) | KO
Aryan Sood (IND) | 1
Saydullo Abdurashitov (UZB) | 2
Amin Ullah (PAK) | 0
Đinh Văn Tâm (VIE) | 2
Erdenebayaryn Enkhtüvshin (MGL)
Fereddy Sinaga (INA) | PD

Semifinals
Ou Jiaming (CHN) | 2
Saydullo Abdurashitov (UZB) | 0
Đinh Văn Tâm (VIE) | 2
Fereddy Sinaga (INA) | 0

Final
Ou Jiaming (CHN) | 2
Đinh Văn Tâm (VIE) | 0
