= Takuya Kurosaka =

Japanese soft tennis player

Personal information
- Native name: 黒坂 卓矢
- Nationality: Japanese
- Born: 17 March 2005 (age 21) Kawaguchi, Saitama, Japan

Sport
- Sport: Soft tennis
- Position: Front player
Medal record
Representing Japan
Asian Games
| Gold medal – first place | 2026 Aichi-Nagoya | Men's team |
| Silver medal – second place | 2026 Aichi-Nagoya | Men's singles |
World Junior Championships
| Gold medal – first place | 2024 Jingshan | U21 men's doubles |
| Silver medal – second place | 2024 Jingshan | Men's team |

Takuya Kurosaka (Japanese: 黒坂 卓矢, born 17 March 2005) is a Japanese soft tennis player. He represents Japan in international competitions and plays as a front player. Kurosaka is a member of Nippon Sport Science University and has represented Japan at senior and junior international competitions. He won the men's singles silver medal and the men's team gold medal at the 2026 Asian Games in Aichi-Nagoya.

== Career ==
Kurosaka was born on 17 March 2005 and attended Shiba-Higashi Junior High School before moving to Jinsei Gakuen High School in Kagawa Prefecture. He later entered Nippon Sport Science University. He won the men's title at the All Japan Intercollegiate Soft Tennis Championships in 2023.

In November 2024, Kurosaka competed at the World Junior Soft Tennis Championships in Jingshan, China. In the men's under-21 competition, he reached the quarter-finals in singles and won the doubles title with Shuichiro Hashiba. The Japanese men's team finished second in the team competition.

In 2025, Kurosaka was selected for the Japanese national team. At the Korea Cup in Incheon, he won the men's doubles title with Toshiki Uematsu, while Japan won the men's team competition.

In June 2026, Kurosaka won the All Japan Mixed Doubles Soft Tennis Championships with Rena Temma. The pair defeated Takafumi Uchimoto and Rena Yoshida 4–1 in the final.

At the 2026 Asian Games in Aichi-Nagoya, Kurosaka won the silver medal in the men's singles event. He defeated India's Jay Meena in the semi-final before losing to compatriot Toshiki Uematsu in the final, 3–4. He also won a gold medal in the men's team event as part of the Japanese team.
