= Mark Sangiao =

MMA coach and fighter (b. 1979)

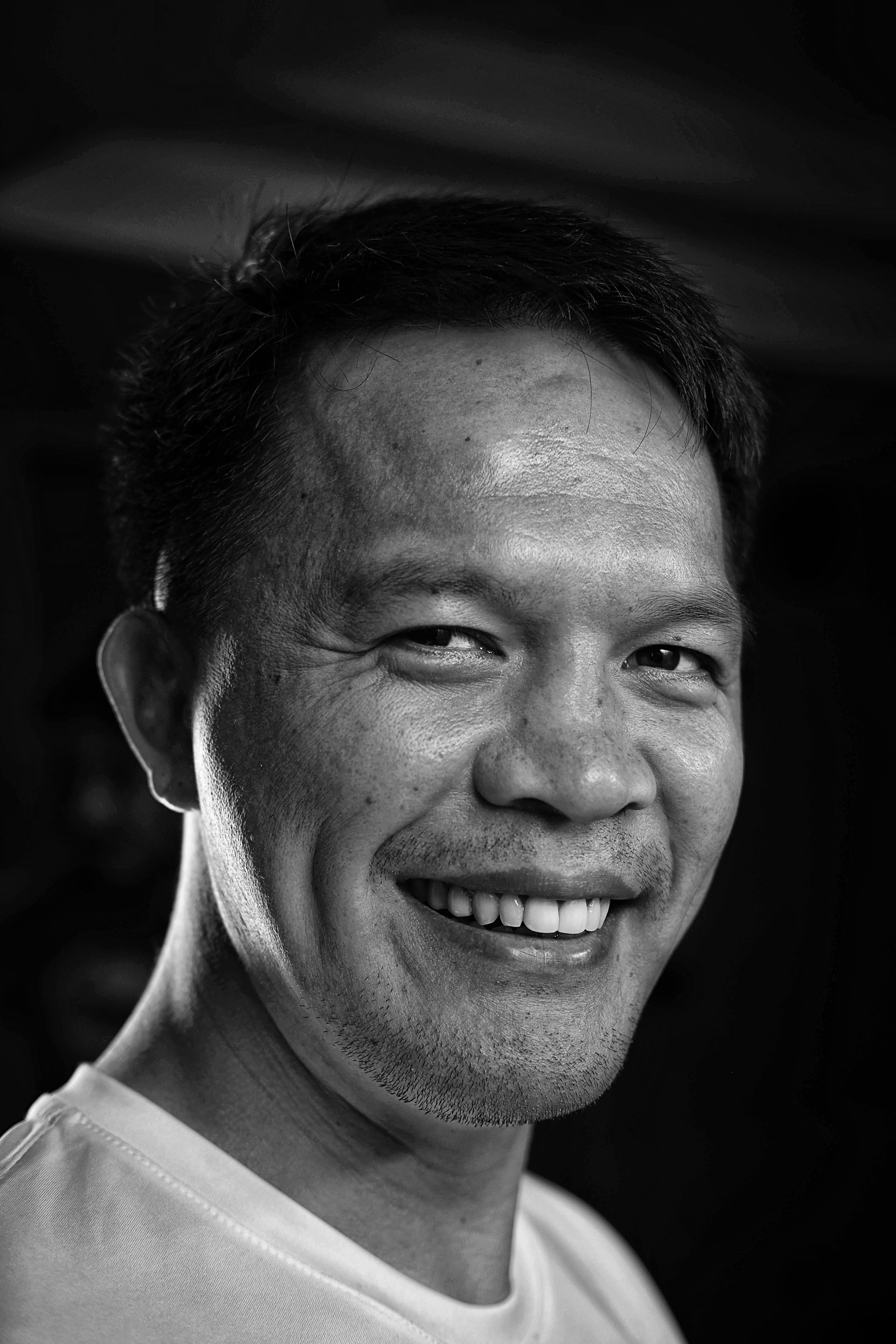
- Born: Marquez Tacio Sangiao; March 25, 1979 (age 46); Baguio, Philippines
- Other names: The Machine
- Nationality: Filipino
- Height: 5 ft 6 in (1.67 m)
- Weight: 139 lb (63.05 kg)
- Team: Team Lakay

Other information
- Occupation: Martial arts coach
- Children: 2

Marquez Tacio Sangiao (born March 25, 1979) professionally known as Mark Sangiao, is a Filipino martial arts coach and former professional mixed martial artist. His students include fighters such as Stephen Loman, Joshua Pacio, Eduard Folayang, Honorio Banario, Geje Eustaquio, Kevin Belingon, Danny Kingad, and his son, Jhanlo Mark Sangiao. Sangiao is the founder of Team Lakay in 2003.

== Background ==
He is the founder and head coach of Team Lakay. While completing his master's degree at his alma mater, he taught at the school's Criminology Department in 2004, in addition to coaching the varsity wushu team. He began training in kickboxing in 1995 to transition to taekwondo in 1998 and made the varsity wushu squad at the Baguio Colleges Foundation, which was later renamed the University of the Cordilleras in 2003. He joined the Philippine Wushu Team in 2001, and won a gold medal at the Southeast Asia Games that same year in Kuala Lumpur, Malaysia. Today, Sangiao is known as one among the best MMA coaches in the Asia. Sangiao was also head coach of the Cordillera chapter in Baguio for Wushu, and a seasoned martial artist with past experience in kickboxing, taekwondo, and Jiu-Jitsu as well as a martial arts instructor at the Philippine Military Academy (PMA) and a coach for Wushu at the University of the Cordilleras in Baguio.

== Mixed martial arts record ==
Professional record breakdown
9 matches	7 wins	2 losses
By knockout	2	1
By submission	4	1
By decision	1	0

Res.	Record	Opponent	Method	Event	Date	Round	Time	Location	Notes
Loss	7–2	Justin Cruz	Submission (Guillotine Choke)	URCC 15 - Onslaught	November 21, 2009	1	3:05	Pasay, Philippines	
Win	7–1	Reysaldo Biagtan	Submission (Armbar)	URCC Baguio - Rumble in the Highlands	March 7, 2009	1	0:00	Baguio, Philippines	
Win	6–1	Isaac Tuling	Decision (Unanimous)	Fearless Fighting Championship - Intensity	August 29, 2008	3	5:00	Pasig, Philippines	
Loss	5–1	He Peng	KO	URCC 7 - The Art of War	December 10, 2005	1	9:18	Quezon City, Philippines	
Win	5–0	Steven Ramos	Submission (Armbar)	URCC 6 - Unleashed Fury	June 25, 2005	1	0:12	Parañaque, Philippines	
Win	4–0	Lino Tagacay	Submission (Rear Naked Choke)	URCC 5 - Beyond Fear	October 23, 2004	1	9:57	Parañaque, Philippines	
Win	3–0	Miguel Chavez	Submission (Rear Naked Choke)	URCC 4 - Return to the Dungeon	April 24, 2004	1	7:58	Parañaque, Philippines	
Win	2–0	Arnel Arancina	TKO (Referee Stoppage)	URCC 3 - Siege at the Fort	September 20, 2003	2	1:10	Taguig, Philippines	
Win	1–0	Freddy Cepeda	TKO (Punches)	Fearless Fighting Championship - Relentless	March 10, 2003	2	0:00	Pasig, Philippines	
