= Mixed martial arts at the 2026 Asian Games – Men's modern 71 kg =

Men's modern 71 kg at the 2026 Asian Games
- Venue: Nagoya City Inae Sports Center
- Dates: 20–22 September 2026
- Competitors: 9 from 9 nations

Medalists
| gold medal | Kadyrbek Shinbayev | Kazakhstan |
| silver medal | Behruz Khurshedzoda | Tajikistan |
| bronze medal | Yryskeldi Duisheev | Kyrgyzstan |
| bronze medal | Nodirbek Shavkatov | Uzbekistan |

The men's MMA modern 71 kilograms competition at the 2026 Asian Games in Nagoya, Japan was held from 20 to 22 September 2026 at the Nagoya City Inae Sports Center.

Competition bouts consist of 2 rounds in total, each lasting 3 minutes in Preliminary matches or 5 minutes in Finals with a one-minute rest period between rounds. Grabbing and holding the competition clothing and shorts is illegal.

== Schedule ==
All times are Japan Standard Time (UTC+09:00)

| Date | Time | Event |
|---|---|---|
| Sunday, 20 September 2026 | 10:20 | Preliminary Round |
| Sunday, 20 September 2026 | 15:00 | Quarterfinals |
| Monday, 21 September 2026 | 11:10 | Semifinals |
| Tuesday, 22 September 2026 | 16:04 | Final |

== Results ==
Preliminary round
Behruz Khurshedzoda (TJK) | 3
Saksit Janhom (THA)

Quarterfinals
Marwan Nassar (JOR) | 0
Behruz Khurshedzoda (TJK) | 3
Sami Akkawe (PLE) | 0
Yryskeldi Duisheev (KGZ) | 3
Kurban Idrisov (BRN) | 0
Kadyrbek Shinbayev (KAZ) | 3
Nodirbek Shavkatov (UZB) | 3
Choi Eunsok (KOR) | 0

Semifinals
Behruz Khurshedzoda (TJK) | 3
Yryskeldi Duisheev (KGZ) | 0
Kadyrbek Shinbayev (KAZ) | 3
Nodirbek Shavkatov (UZB) | 0

Final
Behruz Khurshedzoda (TJK) | 0
Kadyrbek Shinbayev (KAZ) | 3

== External Link ==
- Results
