= Kim Hyun-soo =

Kim Hyun-soo, Kim Hyun-su, Kim Hyeon-soo, Kim Hyeon-su is the name of:

- Kim Hyeon-soo (politician) (born 1961), South Korean politician
- Kim Hyun-su (footballer, born February 1973) (born February 1973), South Korean association football player, formerly of Jeonnam Dragons
- Kim Hyun-soo (footballer, born March 1973), South Korean association football player, formerly of Busan Daewoo Royals
- Hyun-soo Kim (born 1988), South Korean baseball player
- Kim Hyun-soo (rugby union) (born 1988), South Korean rugby union player
- Hyunsoo Kim (born 1990), South Korean entrepreneur
- Kim Hyun-soo (actress) (born 2000), South Korean actress
