= Park Jae-kyu =

South Korean academic

- Title: President of Kyungnam University
- Term: 1986–2000, 2003–present

Korean name
- Hangul: 박재규
- Hanja: 朴在圭
- RR: Bak Jaegyu
- MR: Pak Chaegyu

Park Jae-kyu is the president of Kyungnam University in Masan, South Korea, and the former Unification Minister and National Security Council Chairman of South Korea.

== Higher education and academic career ==
In 1963, Park went to New York to study English at Columbia University, then enrolled at Fairleigh Dickinson University where he majored in International Relations. At the City College of New York (CCNY), he developed a keen interest in North Korean studies. After obtaining diplomas from the University of Exeter in England and The New School in New York, Park Jae-kyu gained his PhD from Kyunghee University in South Korea.

As a Professor at Kyungnam University, Park launched the Institute of Far Eastern Studies (IFES) in 1972 in order to promote peace and Korean reunification through scholarly projects.

Park became president of Kyungnam University in 1986, a position he retained until 2000, and again from 2003 till today. He also chaired associations such as the Korean University Presidents Association (2001–2004), the Isang Yun Peace Foundation (2005–2009), the Northeast Asian Forum of University Presidents (2003–2011). He was also the president of the University of North Korean Studies from 2005 to 2009.

== Inter-Korean Peace action ==
In 1999, South Korean president Kim Dae-jung appointed Park as Unification Minister, in charge of implementing cooperation and reconciliation policies with North Korea. In that capacity, Park Jae-kyu played an important role in organizing the first Inter-Korean summit in June 2000. He continues to advise the president of South Korea on matters related to Korean reunification, and participates in the Presidential Committee on Social Cohesion.

== Awards ==
Park has received numerous honors, such as the Special Jury Prize for Conflict Prevention, awarded by the Fondation Chirac in 2009.

== Publications ==
Park has authored many books on North Korea and inter-Korean relations, including:

- North Korea's Foreign Policy (1977)
- North Korea's Military Policy (1983)
- Politics of North Korea (1984)
- New Diplomacy of North Korea and Its Survival Strategy (1997)
- A Guide to Understanding North Korea (ed., Korean, 1997)
- New Readings of North Korea (ed., Korean, 2004)
- North Korea's Dilemma and Future (ed., Korean, 2011).
