= Mixed martial arts at the 2026 Asian Games – Men's modern 60 kg =

Men's modern 60 kg at the 2026 Asian Games
- Venue: Nagoya City Inae Sports Center
- Dates: 20–22 September 2026
- Competitors: 9 from 9 nations

Medalists
gold medal	Mirzobek Umarov	Tajikistan
silver medal	Firdavs Atamuratov	Uzbekistan
bronze medal	Dastan Kanybek Uulu	Kyrgyzstan
bronze medal	Asim Khan	Pakistan

The men's MMA modern 60 kilograms competition at the 2026 Asian Games in Nagoya, Japan was held from 20 to 22 September 2026 at the Nagoya City Inae Sports Center.

Competition bouts consist of 2 rounds in total, each lasting 3 minutes in Preliminary matches or 5 minutes in Finals with a one-minute rest period between rounds. Grabbing and holding the clothing and shorts of the Modern MMA combat attire is prohibited.

== Schedule ==
All times are Japan Standard Time (UTC+09:00)

Date	Time	Event
Sunday, 20 September 2026	10:00	Preliminary Round
Sunday, 20 September 2026	11:00	Quarterfinals
Monday, 21 September 2026	11:00	Semifinals
Tuesday, 22 September 2026	14:00	Final

== Results ==
Preliminary round
Dastan Kanybek Uulu (KGZ)	3
Kojiro Nakashima (JPN)	0

Quarterfinals
Dastan Kanybek Uulu (KGZ)	3
Amin Ghaedifar (IRI)	0
Firdavs Atamuratov (UZB)	3
Malik Waleed Basahel (KSA)	0
Mirzobek Umarov (TJK)	3
Chang Li (TPE)	0
Asim Khan (PAK)	3
Sopanha Pheng (CAM)	0

Semifinals
Dastan Kanybek Uulu (KGZ)	0
Firdavs Atamuratov (UZB)	2
Mirzobek Umarov (TJK)	3
Asim Khan (PAK)	0

Final
Firdavs Atamuratov (UZB)	0
Mirzobek Umarov (TJK)	3

== External Link ==
- Results
