= Lee Soo-jin (politician, born May 1969) =

South Korean politician (born 1969)

- 이수진

Member of the National Assembly
- Incumbent
- Assumed office 30 May 2020
- Constituency: Proportional representation

Personal details
- Born: 14 May 1969 (age 57) Daejeon, South Korea
- Party: Democratic
- Education: Sahmyook Health University; Yonsei University

Korean name
- Hangul: 이수진
- Hanja: 李壽珍
- RR: I Sujin
- MR: I Sujin

Lee Soo-jin (Korean: 이수진; born 14 May 1969) is a South Korean labour activist-turned politician currently serving as a Democratic member of National Assembly.

== Career ==
Before entering politics in 2012, Lee was a nurse and trade unionist. From 2010 to 2014, Lee was the deputy head of Seoul's division of Federation of Korean Trade Unions and head of its women's committee. From 2011 to 2017 she led the trade union of the most famous hospital brand in Korea, Yonsei Severance Hospitals.

From 2012 she has taken numerous roles in her party and its succeeding parties such as its deputy spokesperson, deputy chair of its women's committee and senior deputy chair of its labor committee. In 2018 she became the member of its Supreme Council.

In the 2016 general election, she was placed as the number 21 on her party's proportional representation list. In the 2020 general election, she was placed as its number 3. However, following her party's decision to create proportional representation-only sister party, Platform Party, she was re-placed as the number 13.

== Education ==
Lee holds two degrees - a bachelor in nursing from now-Sahmyook Health University College and a MPP from Yonsei University. She is currently taking a doctorate programme in administration at Myongji University.

== Electoral history ==
Election	Year	District	Party affiliation	Votes	Percentage of votes	Results
20th National Assembly General Election	2016	Proportional representation	Democratic Party	6,069,744	25.54%	Lost
21st National Assembly General Election	2020	Proportional representation	Platform Party	9,307,112	33.3%	Won
