= Lee Su-jin =

Lee Su-jin (Korean: 이수진) is a Korean name composed of the surname Lee (alternately romanized as Yi, Rhee, I, or Ri) and the given name Su-jin (alternatively romanized as Soo-jin, Sue-jin, or Su-chin). People with this name include:

- Lee Su-jin (politician, born November 1969), South Korean ex-judge and politician
- Lee Soo-jin (politician, born May 1969), South Korean labor activist and politician
- Lee Su-jin (director) (born 1971), South Korean male film director
- Lee Su-jin (businessman) (born 1978), South Korean businessman and founder of Yanolja
- Lee Soojin, South Korean male drummer, member of rock band Messgram
- Soojin (born Lee Soo-jin), South Korean singer, member of girl group Weeekly

== See also ==
- Lee Seo-jin (born 1971), South Korean male actor
