= Mixed martial arts at the 2026 Asian Games – Men's traditional 65 kg =

Men's traditional 65 kg at the 2026 Asian Games
- Venue: Nagoya City Inae Sports Center
- Dates: 20–22 September 2026
- Competitors: 9 from 9 nations

Medalists
gold medal	Otabek Rajabov	Tajikistan
silver medal	Jean Claude Saclag	Philippines
bronze medal	Sanzhar Adilov	Kazakhstan
bronze medal	Daisuke Murayama	Japan

The men's MMA traditional 65 kilograms competition at the 2026 Asian Games in Nagoya, Japan was held from 20 to 22 September 2026 at the Nagoya City Inae Sports Center.

Competition bouts consist of 2 rounds in total, each lasting 3 minutes in Preliminary matches or 5 minutes in Finals with a one-minute rest period between rounds. Grabbing and holding the clothing (Gi), pants, or belt of the Traditional MMA combat attire is legal.

== Schedule ==
All times are Japan Standard Time (UTC+09:00)

Date	Time	Event
Sunday, 20 September 2026	10:30	Preliminary Round
Sunday, 20 September 2026	15:40	Quarterfinals
Monday, 21 September 2026	11:30	Semifinals
Tuesday, 22 September 2026	15:47	Final

== Results ==
Preliminary round
Afshin Salimi Touphgara (IRI)	3
Mohamed Alsameea (BRN)	0

Quarterfinals
Sanzhar Adilov (KAZ)	2
Afshin Salimi Touphgara (IRI)	0
Otabek Rajabov (TJK)	3
Husniddin Nasriddinov (UZB)	0
Saud Al-Molhem (KSA)	0
Jean Claude Saclag (PHI)	3
Daisuke Murayama (JPN)	3
Gibran Alfarizi (INA)	0

Semifinals
Sanzhar Adilov (KAZ)
Otabek Rajabov (TJK)	WO
Jean Claude Saclag (PHI)	3
Daisuke Murayama (JPN)	0

Final
Otabek Rajabov (TJK)	3
Jean Claude Saclag (PHI)	0

== External Link ==
- Results
