= Hyunsoo Kim =

South Korean entrepreneur (born 1990)

- 김현수

Personal details
- Born: 1990 South Korea
- Education: Duke University (BS, PhD dropout)
- Occupation: Businessman
- Known for: Founding Superb AI

Hyunsoo Kim (Korean: 김현수; born 1990) is a South Korean entrepreneur and chief executive officer (CEO) of Superb AI, a data training platform that he co-founded in 2018.

== Early life and education ==
Kim was born in South Korea in 1990. In the fifth grade, he moved to Singapore, where he attended middle school and high school.

He graduated from Duke University with a Bachelor of Science, summa cum laude. At Duke, he then pursued a Ph.D. in computer science, focusing on AI and robotics, which he later dropped out of.

== Career ==
=== Early career ===
During his Ph.D., Kim was recruited by SK Telecom in 2016, where he worked as a research engineer.

=== Superb AI ===
In April 2018, Kim co-founded Superb AI with colleagues from SK to lower the barrier to entry for developing production-grade artificial intelligence. The company initially focused on automating data labeling.

In 2019, Superb AI joined Y Combinator, and has raised $37 million in total funding as of October 2024.

In 2021, Kim became the youngest member of the Special Committee on the 4th Industrial Revolution of the National Assembly of the Republic of Korea.

== Recognition ==
In 2020, Kim was listed on Forbes 30 under 30 Asia under the Enterprise Technology category. In 2021, he was listed on the MIT Technology Review's Innovators Under 35.
