= Jean Claude Saclag =

Filipino wushu practitioner (born 1994)

- Saclag in 2023

Personal information
- Nationality: Filipino
- Born: September 25, 1994 (age 32)
- Education: University of the Cordilleras; (BPEd)

Sport
- Country: Philippines
- Sport: Wushu, Kickboxing, MMA
- Events: Taijiquan, Taijijian, Duilian
- Team: Team Lakay
Medal record
Wushu
Representing Philippines
Sanda World Cup
Gold medal – first place	2014 Jakarta	Sanda -60kg
Asian Games
Silver medal – second place	2014 Incheon	Sanda -60kg
Wushu World Championships
Bronze medal – third place	2013 Kuala Lumpur	Sanda -56kg
Kickboxing
Representing Philippines
Southeast Asian Games
Gold medal – first place	2019 Philippines	-63.5kg
Gold medal – first place	2021 Vietnam	-63.5kg
Gold medal – first place	2023 Cambodia	-63.5kg
MMA
Representing Philippines
Asian Championship
Gold medal – first place	2026 Tashkent	trad -65kg
Asian Games
Silver medal – second place	2026 Aichi-Nagoya	trad -65kg
- Updated on September 22, 2026

Jean Claude Kitong Saclag (born September 25, 1994) is a Filipino wushu, kickboxing, and mixed martial arts practitioner. Known as "The Dynamite" in the MMA pro circle, Saclag is an accomplished fighter in multiple disciplines, having won a gold medal at the Sanda World Cup and a silver medal at the 2014 Asian Games in wushu, three SEA Games gold medals in kickboxing, and a silver medal in MMA at the 2026 Asian Games.

== Career ==
=== Wushu ===
Saclag initially competed for the Philippines in international wushu tournaments. He first competed at the 2013 Wushu World Championship in Kuala Lumpur, Malaysia. His best wushu achievements include a gold medal at the 2014 Wushu Sanda World Cup in Jakarta, Indonesia, and a silver medal at the 2014 Asian Games in Incheon, South Korea.

=== Kickboxing ===
Building on his wushu background, Saclag transitioned to kickboxing in 2019. He dominated the SEA Games by winning gold medals in the 2019, 2021, and 2023 editions. He also claimed the gold medal at the 2022 Asian Kickboxing Championship.

=== Mixed martial arts ===
Saclag has represented the Philippines at various international tournaments while building his career in the professional MMA scene. He made his professional MMA debut in May 2019 under the Shooto banner. In 2024, he joined the ONE Championship and made a successful debut. Saclag is part of Benguet's Team Lakay.

In May 2026, Saclag won the Men's Traditional MMA -65kg division title at the 4th Asian Mixed Martial Arts Championship held in Tashkent, Uzbekistan, securing automatic qualification for the 20th Asian Games. He later won the silver medal in the men’s under-65-kilogram traditional MMA division for the Philippines at the 2026 Asian Games in Japan.

== Personal life ==
Saclag who has connections to Lubuagan, Kalinga and Kapangan, Benguet, is the youngest among the thirteen children of Lubuagan former vice mayor Patricio Saclag and Judith Kitong.

Saclag studied at the University of the Cordilleras for his higher education and at St. Teresita's School in Benguet for primary and secondary education.

== Mixed martial arts record ==
Professional record breakdown
8 matches	5 wins	3 losses
By knockout	5	1
By submission	0	1
By decision	0	1

Res.	Record	Opponent	Method	Event	Date	Round	Time	Location	Notes
Loss	5–3	Viet Anh Do	TKO (punches)	ONE Friday Fights 140	January 30, 2026	1	0:59	Bangkok, Thailand	
Win	5–2	Juan Trujillo	TKO (spinning back kick)	ONE Friday Fights 127	October 3, 2025	1	3:05	Bangkok, Thailand	
Loss	4–2	Shazada Ataev	Submission (armbar)	ONE Friday Fights 109	September 6, 2025	2	3:47	Bangkok, Thailand	
Win	4–1	Fajar	TKO (punches)	ONE Friday Fights 94	January 17, 2025	1	3:37	Bangkok, Thailand	
Win	3–1	Lee Jun-young	KO (punches)	ONE Friday Fights 78	September 6, 2024	1	1:34	Bangkok, Thailand	
Win	2–1	Gemil Clariño	TKO (punches)	Team Lakay Championship 19	March 30, 2024	1	1:57	La Trinidad, Philippines	
Win	1–1	Ronald Regalado	TKO (leg kicks and punches)	Team Lakay Championship 18	December 9, 2023	1	0:35	La Trinidad, Philippines	
Loss	0–1	Ryo Okada	Decision (unanimous)	Shooto: 30th Anniversary Tour at Korakuen Hall	May 6, 2019	3	5:00	Tokyo, Japan	Bantamweight debut.
