= Jay Meena =

Indian soft tennis player (born 2002)

Personal information
- Nationality: Indian
- Born: 2002 (age 23–24) Dewas, Madhya Pradesh, India

Sport
- Sport: Soft tennis
- Event: Men's singles
Medal record
Men's Soft tennis
Representing India
Asian Games
Bronze medal – third place	2026 Aichi–Nagoya	Men's singles

Jay Meena (born 2002) is an Indian soft tennis player. He claimed a bronze medal in the men's singles event at the 2026 Asian Games.

Meena is from Dewas, Madhya Pradesh, India.

== Career ==
On 23 September 2026, Meena lost the semifinal match to Japan's Takuya Kurosaka 2-4 (3-5, 1-4, 1-4, 4-1, 6-4, 1-4) in the 45-minute semifinal of the men's singles event at the 2026 Asian Games. Earlier, he defeated Philippines' Nuguit Sherwin in the quarterfinals and beat Pakistan’s Arain Hussain 4-0 in a Group D match.
