= India at the 2022 Asian Games =

- Flag of India
- IOC code: IND
- NOC: Indian Olympic Association
- Website: olympic.ind.in

in Hangzhou, China 23 September 2023 – 8 October 2023
- Competitors: 661 (333 men and 328 women) in 35 sports
- Flag bearers (opening): Harmanpreet Singh; Lovlina Borgohain
- Flag bearer (closing): P. R. Sreejesh
- Medals Ranked 4th: Gold 28 Silver 38 Bronze 40 Total 106

Asian Games appearances (overview)
- 1951; 1954; 1958; 1962; 1966; 1970; 1974; 1978; 1982; 1986; 1990; 1994; 1998; 2002; 2006; 2010; 2014; 2018; 2022; 2026

India competed at the 2022 Asian Games in Hangzhou, China, from 23 September to 8 October 2023. The event was scheduled to be held in September 2022 but was postponed due to COVID-19 pandemic. This was India's 19th consecutive appearance at the Asian Games.

The Indian contingent consisted of 661 athletes. Harmanpreet Kaur and Lovlina Borgohain were the nation's flag-bearers during the opening ceremony, and P. R. Sreejesh carried the flag during the closing ceremony.

India achieved its best ever medal haul at the Asian Games with 106 medals beating the previous best of 70 medals won at the 2018 Asian Games. India became the fourth nation to win more than 100 medals in a single edition after China, Japan, and South Korea.

== Background ==
The Indian Olympic Association (IOA) was established in 1927 and recognised by the International Olympic Committee in the same year. India was one of the founding members of the Asian Games Federation (AGF), established on 13 February 1949. On 26 November 1981, the Olympic Council of Asia (OCA) replaced the AGF, and India became the member of OCA.

India hosted the first Asian Games in 1951 at New Delhi. The 2022 Asian Games was held in Hangzhou, China, from 23 September to 8 October 2023. The event was scheduled to be held in September 2022 but was postponed due to COVID-19 pandemic. The 2022 edition marked India's 19th consecutive appearance at the Asian Games.

The Indian contingent consisted of 661 athletes. Harmanpreet Kaur and Lovlina Borgohain were the nation's flag-bearers during the opening ceremony, and P. R. Sreejesh carried the flag during the closing ceremony.

=== Broadcasting ===
Sony Pictures Networks acquired the broadcast rights for the country, with Sony Sports Network as the television broadcaster and SonyLIV as the digital broadcaster. The network launched a campaign supporting India with the slogan, Hum Hain, Zidd Pe Sawaar, Iss Baar, Sau Paar, Phir Se, Hum Honge Kamyaab! roughly translating to "India shall cross the 100-medal mark this time".

== Medalists ==
India achieved its best ever medal haul at the Asian Games with 106 medals including 28 gold, 38 silver, and 40 bronze medals and finished fourth in the overall medal table. Thus, India became the fourth nation to win more than 100 medals in a single edition after China, Japan, and South Korea. Shooting contributed the most medals, with Indian shooters setting multiple world records during the Games. India won its first ever gold medal in badminton at the Asian Games.

Medal	Name	Sport	Event	Date
Gold	Divyansh Panwar; Rudrankksh Patil; Aishwary Tomar	Shooting	Men's 10m air rifle team	25 September
Gold	India women's national cricket team: Harmanpreet Kaur; Smriti Mandhana; Shafali Verma; Jemimah Rodrigues; Deepti Sharma; Richa Ghosh; Uma Chetry; Anusha Bareddy; Amanjot Kaur; Devika Vaidya; Pooja Vastrakar; Titas Sadhu; Rajeshwari Gayakwad; Minnu Mani; Kanika Ahuja	Cricket	Women's tournament	25 September
Gold	Anush Agarwalla; Hriday Chheda; Divyakirti Singh; Sudipti Hajela	Equestrian	Team dressage	26 September
Gold	Esha Singh; Manu Bhaker; Rhythm Sangwan	Shooting	Women's 25m pistol team	27 September
Gold	Sift Kaur Samra	Shooting	Women's 50m rifle three positions	27 September
Gold	Arjun Cheema; Shiva Narwal; Sarabjot Singh	Shooting	Men's 10m air pistol team	28 September
Gold	Aishwary Tomar; Akhil Sheoran; Swapnil Kusale	Shooting	Men's 50m rifle three positions team	29 September
Gold	Palak Gulia	Shooting	Women's 10m air pistol	29 September
Gold	Rohan Bopanna; Rutuja Bhosale	Lawn Tennis	Mixed doubles	30 September
Gold	Saurav Ghosal; Abhay Singh; Mahesh Mangaonkar; Harinder Pal Sandhu	Squash	Men's team	30 September
Gold	Kynan Chenai; Prithviraj Tondaiman; Zoravar Singh	Shooting	Men's trap team	1 October
Gold	Avinash Sable	Athletics	Men's 3000 m steeplechase	1 October
Gold	Tajinderpal Singh Toor	Athletics	Men's shot put	1 October
Gold	Parul Chaudhary	Athletics	Women's 5000 m	3 October
Gold	Annu Rani	Athletics	Women's javelin throw	3 October
Gold	Jyothi Surekha; Ojas Deotale	Archery	Mixed team compound	4 October
Gold	Neeraj Chopra	Athletics	Men's javelin throw	4 October
Gold	Amoj Jacob; Rajesh Ramesh; Mohammad Anas; Muhammad Ajmal	Athletics	Men's 4 × 400 m relay	4 October
Gold	Aditi Swami; Jyothi Surekha; Parneet Kaur	Archery	Women's team compound	5 October
Gold	Harinder Pal Sandhu; Dipika Pallikal	Squash	Mixed doubles	5 October
Gold	Abhishek Verma; Ojas Deotale; Prathamesh Jawkar	Archery	Men's team compound	5 October
Gold	India men's national field hockey team: Abhishek Nain; Gurjant Singh; Hardik Singh; Harmanpreet Singh; Jarmanpreet Singh; Mandeep Singh; Manpreet Singh; Sanjay Rana; Shamsher Singh; Sukhjeet Singh; Sumit Walmiki; P. R. Sreejesh; Varun Kumar; Krishan Pathak; Vivek Prasad; Amit Rohidas; Nilakanta Sharma; Lalit Upadhyay	Field hockey	Men's tournament	6 October
Gold	Jyothi Surekha	Archery	Women compound individual	7 October
Gold	Ojas Deotale	Archery	Men compound individual	7 October
Gold	India women's national kabaddi team: Akshima Singh; Jyoti Thakur; Pooja Hathwala; Pooja Narwal; Priyanka Pilaniya; Pushpa Rana; Sakshi Kumari; Ritu Negi; Nidhi Sharma; Sushma Sharma; Snehal Shinde; Muskan Malik	Kabaddi	Women's team	7 October
Gold	Chirag Shetty; Satwiksairaj Rankireddy	Badminton	Men's doubles	7 October
Gold	India men's national cricket team: Ruturaj Gaikwad; Yashasvi Jaiswal; Rahul Tripathi; Tilak Varma; Rinku Singh; Jitesh Sharma; Washington Sundar; Shahbaz Ahmed; Ravi Bishnoi; Avesh Khan; Arshdeep Singh; Mukesh Kumar; Shivam Dube; Prabhsimran Singh; Sai Kishore	Cricket	Men's tournament	7 October
Gold	India men's national kabaddi team: Pawan Sehrawat; Nitesh Kumar; Parvesh Bhainswal; Sachin Tanwar; Surjeet Singh; Vishal Bhardwaj; Arjun Deshwal; Aslam Inamdar; Naveen Kumar; Sunil Kumar; Nitin Rawal; Akash Shinde	Kabaddi	Men's team	7 October
Silver	Mehuli Ghosh; Ramita Jindal; Ashi Chouksey	Shooting	Women's 10m air rifle team	24 September
Silver	Arvind Singh; Arjun Lal Jat	Rowing	Men's Lightweight double sculls	24 September
Silver	Jaswinder Singh; Bheem Singh; Punit Kumar; Ashish Godara; Neeraj Maan; Naresh Kalwaniya; Neetish Kumar; Charanjeet Singh; Dhananjay Pande	Rowing	Men's eight	24 September
Silver	Neha Thakur	Sailing	Girl's Dinghy ILCA4	26 September
Silver	Ashi Chouksey; Sift Kaur Samra; Manini Kaushik	Shooting	Women's 50m rifle three positions team	27 September
Silver	Esha Singh	Shooting	Women's 25m pistol	27 September
Silver	Anantjeet Singh Naruka	Shooting	Men's skeet	27 September
Silver	Naorem Roshibina Devi	Wushu	Women's sanda 60kg	28 September
Silver	Divya T. S.; Esha Singh; Palak Gulia	Shooting	Women's 10m air pistol team	29 September
Silver	Saketh Myneni; Ramkumar Ramanathan	Lawn Tennis	Men's doubles	29 September
Silver	Esha Singh	Shooting	Women's 10m air pistol	29 September
Silver	Aishwary Pratap Singh Tomar	Shooting	Men's 50m rifle three positions	29 September
Silver	Sarabjot Singh; Divya T. S.	Shooting	Mixed 10 metre air pistol	30 September
Silver	Kartik Kumar	Athletics	Men's 10,000 m	30 September
Silver	Aditi Ashok	Golf	Women's Individual	1 October
Silver	Manisha Keer; Preeti Rajak; Rajeshwari Kumari	Shooting	Women's trap team	1 October
Silver	Harmilan Bains	Athletics	Women's 1500 m	1 October
Silver	Ajay Kumar Saroj	Athletics	Men's 1500 m	1 October
Silver	Murali Sreeshankar	Athletics	Men's long jump	1 October
Silver	Jyothi Yarraji	Athletics	Women's 100 m hurdles	1 October
Silver	Lakshya Sen; Srikanth Kidambi; Prannoy H. S.; Mithun Manjunath; Chirag Shetty; Satwiksairaj Rankireddy; Arjun M.R.; Dhruv Kapila; Rohan Kapoor; K. Sai Pratheek	Badminton	Men's team	1 October
Silver	Parul Chaudhary	Athletics	Women's 3000 m steeplechase	2 October
Silver	Ancy Sojan	Athletics	Women's long jump	2 October
Silver	Muhammad Ajmal; Vithya Ramraj; Rajesh Ramesh; Subha Venkatesan	Athletics	Mixed 4×400 m relay	2 October
Silver	Mohammed Afsal	Athletics	Men's 800 m	3 October
Silver	Tejaswin Shankar	Athletics	Men's decathlon	3 October
Silver	Lovlina Borgohain	Boxing	Women's 75 kg	4 October
Silver	Harmilan Bains	Athletics	Women's 800 m	4 October
Silver	Avinash Sable	Athletics	Men's 5000 m	4 October
Silver	Vithya Ramraj; Subha Venkatesan; Aishwarya Mishra; Prachi Choudhary	Athletics	Women's 4 × 400 m relay	4 October
Silver	Kishore Jena	Athletics	Men's javelin throw	4 October
Silver	Saurav Ghosal	Squash	Men's singles	5 October
Silver	Atanu Das; Dhiraj Bommadevara; Tushar Shelke	Archery	Men's recurve team	6 October
Silver	Jaggy Shivdasani; Sandeep Thakral; Rajeshwar Tiwari; Sumit Mukherjee; Raju Tolani; Ajay Khare	Bridge	Men's team	6 October
SilverP	Abhishek Verma	Archery	Men compound individual	7 October
Silver	Deepak Punia	Wrestling	Men's freestyle 86 kg	7 October
Silver	Gukesh D; R Praggnanandhaa; Vidit Gujrathi; Arjun Erigaisi; Pentala Harikrishna	Chess	Men's team	7 October
Silver	Koneru Humpy; Harika Dronavalli; R Vaishali; Vantika Agrawal; Savitha Shri B	Chess	Women's team	7 October
Bronze	Babu Lal Yadav; Lekh Ram	Rowing	Men's Coxless pair	24 September
Bronze	Ramita Jindal	Shooting	Women's 10m air rifle	24 September
Bronze	Jaswinder Singh; Bheem Singh; Punit Kumar; Ashish	Rowing	Men's coxless four	25 September
Bronze	Satnam Singh; Parminder Singh; Jakar Khan; Sukhmeet Singh	Rowing	Men's Quadruple sculls	25 September
Bronze	Aishwary Pratap Singh Tomar	Shooting	Men's 10m air rifle	25 September
Bronze	Adarsh Singh; Vijayveer Sidhu; Anish Bhanwala	Shooting	Men's 25m rapid fire pistol team	25 September
Bronze	Eabad Ali	Sailing	Men's Windsurfer RS:X	26 September
Bronze	Ashi Chouksey	Shooting	Women's 50m rifle three positions	27 September
Bronze	Gurjoat Siingh; Anantjeet Naruka; Angad Vir Singh	Shooting	Men's skeet team	27 September
Bronze	Vishnu Saravanan	Sailing	Men's dinghy ILCA7	27 September
Bronze	Anush Agarwalla	Equestrian	Individual dressage	28 September
Bronze	Joshna Chinappa; Dipika Pallikal; Anahat Singh; Tanvi Khanna	Squash	Women's team	29 September
Bronze	Kiran Baliyan	Athletics	Women's shot put	29 September
Bronze	Gulveer Singh	Athletics	Men's 10,000 m	30 September
Bronze	Kynan Chenai	Shooting	Men's trap	1 October
Bronze	Nikhat Zareen	Boxing	Women's 50 kg	1 October
Bronze	Jinson Johnson	Athletics	Men's 1500 m	1 October
Bronze	Seema Punia	Athletics	Women's discus throw	1 October
Bronze	Nandini Agasara	Athletics	Women's Heptathlon	1 October
Bronze	Vikram Ingale; Siddhant Kamble; Aryanpal Singh; Anandkumar Velkumar	Roller sports	Men's Speed skating 3,000 m relay	2 October
Bronze	Aarathy Kasturiraj; Heeral Sadhu; Karthika Jagadeeshwaran; Sanjana Bathula	Roller sports	Women's Speed skating 3,000 m relay	2 October
Bronze	Sutirtha Mukherjee; Ayhika Mukherjee	Table tennis	Women's doubles	2 October
Bronze	Priti Lamba	Athletics	Women's 3000 m steeplechase	2 October
Bronze	Arjun Singh; Sunil Singh	Canoeing	Men's sprint C-2 1000 m	3 October
Bronze	Preeti Pawar	Boxing	Women's 54 kg	3 October
Bronze	Vithya Ramraj	Athletics	Women's 400 m hurdles	3 October
Bronze	Praveen Chithravel	Athletics	Men's triple jump	3 October
Bronze	Narinder Berwal	Boxing	Men's +92 kg	3 October
Bronze	Ram Baboo; Manju Rani	Athletics	Mixed team 35 km race walk	4 October
Bronze	Abhay Singh; Anahat Singh	Squash	Mixed doubles	4 October
Bronze	Sunil Kumar	Wrestling	Men's Greco-Roman 87 kg	4 October
Bronze	Antim Panghal	Wrestling	Women's freestyle 53 kg	5 October
Bronze	Ankita Bhakat; Bhajan Kaur; Simranjeet Kaur	Archery	Women's team recurve	6 October
Bronze	Prannoy H. S.	Badminton	Men's singles	6 October
Bronze	Priya Devi Elangbam; Chaoba Devi Oinam; Maipak Devi Ayekpam; Khusbu; Leirentonbi Devi Elangbam	Sepak takraw	Women's regu	6 October
Bronze	Sonam Malik	Wrestling	Women's freestyle 62kg	6 October
Bronze	Kiran Bishnoi	Wrestling	Women's freestyle 76kg	6 October
Bronze	Aman Sehrawat	Wrestling	Men's freestyle 57kg	6 October
Bronze	Aditi Swami	Archery	Women compound individual	7 October
Bronze	India women's national field hockey team: Deepika Sehrawat; Lalremsiami; Monika Malik; Navneet Kaur; Neha Goyal; Nisha Warsi; Savita Punia; Sonika Tandi; Udita Duhan; Ishika Chaudhary; Deep Grace Ekka; Vandana Kataria; Bichu Devi Kharibam; Sangita Kumari; Vaishnavi Phalke; Salima Tete; Nikki Pradhan; Sushila Chanu	Field hockey	Women's tournament	7 October

=== Medals by sport ===
Medals by sport
Sport	Gold	Silver	Bronze	Total
Shooting	7	9	6	22
Athletics	6	14	9	29
Archery	5	2	2	9
Squash	2	1	2	5
Cricket	2	0	0	2
Kabaddi	2	0	0	2
Badminton	1	1	1	3
Tennis	1	1	0	2
Equestrian	1	0	1	2
Field hockey	1	0	1	2
Rowing	0	2	3	5
Chess	0	2	0	2
Wrestling	0	1	5	6
Boxing	0	1	3	4
Sailing	0	1	2	3
Bridge	0	1	0	1
Golf	0	1	0	1
Wushu	0	1	0	1
Roller sports	0	0	2	2
Canoeing	0	0	1	1
Sepak takraw	0	0	1	1
Table tennis	0	0	1	1
Total	28	38	40	106

=== Medals by day ===
Medals by day
Day	Date	Gold	Silver	Bronze	Total
1	24 September	0	3	2	5
2	25 September	2	0	4	6
3	26 September	1	1	1	3
4	27 September	2	3	3	8
5	28 September	1	1	1	3
6	29 September	2	4	2	8
7	30 September	2	2	1	5
8	1 October	3	7	5	15
9	2 October	0	3	4	7
10	3 October	2	2	5	9
11	4 October	3	5	3	11
12	5 October	3	1	1	5
13	6 October	1	2	6	9
14	7 October	6	4	2	12
15	8 October	0	0	0	0
	Total	28	38	40	106

=== Medals by gender ===
Medals by gender
Gender	Gold	Silver	Bronze	Total
Male	15	19	18	52
Female	9	17	19	45
Mixed/Open	4	2	3	9
Total	28	38	40	106

=== Multiple medalists ===
Multiple medalists
Name	Sport	1st place, gold medalist(s)	2nd place, silver medalist(s)	3rd place, bronze medalist(s)	Total
Jyothi Surekha	Archery	3	0	0	3
Ojas Deotale	Archery	3	0	0	3
APS Tomar	Shooting	2	1	1	4
Harinder Pal Sandhu	Squash	2	0	0	2
Esha Singh	Shooting	1	3	0	4
Abhishek Verma	Archery	1	1	0	2
Avinash Sable	Athletics	1	1	0	2
Muhammad Ajmal	Athletics	1	1	0	2
Parul Chaudhary	Athletics	1	1	0	2
Rajesh Ramesh	Athletics	1	1	0	2
Chirag Shetty	Badminton	1	1	0	2
Satwiksairaj Rankireddy	Badminton	1	1	0	2
Palak Gulia	Shooting	1	1	0	2
Sift Kaur Samra	Shooting	1	1	0	2
Saurav Ghosal	Squash	1	1	0	2
Aditi Swami	Archery	1	0	1	2
Abhay Singh	Squash	1	0	1	2
Dipika Pallikal	Squash	1	0	1	2
Anush Agarwalla	Equestrian	1	0	1	2
Kynan Chenai	Shooting	1	0	1	2
Vithya Ramraj	Athletics	0	2	1	3
Harmilan Bains	Athletics	0	2	0	2
Subha Venkatesan	Athletics	0	2	0	2
A S Naruka	Shooting	0	1	1	2
Ashi Chouksey	Shooting	0	1	1	2
Ramita Jindal	Shooting	0	1	1	2
Bheem Singh	Rowing	0	1	1	2
Jaswinder Singh	Rowing	0	1	1	2
Punit Kumar	Rowing	0	1	1	2
Prannoy H. S.	Badminton	0	1	1	2
Anahat Singh	Squash	0	0	2	2

== Competitors ==
The Indian contingent consisted of 661 athletes.

Sport	Men	Women	Total
Aquatics – Diving	2	0	2
Aquatics – Swimming	12	9	21
Archery	8	8	16
Athletics	35	33	68
Badminton	10	9	19
Basketball	4	16	20
Boxing	7	6	13
Canoeing	8	9	17
Cricket	15	15	30
Cycling	10	4	14
Equestrian	8	2	10
Fencing	4	5	9
Field hockey	18	18	36
Football	22	22	44
Golf	4	3	7
Gymnastics	0	1	1
Handball	0	16	16
Kabaddi	12	12	24
Martial arts – Ju-jitsu	4	7	11
Martial arts – Judo	1	3	4
Martial arts – Kurash	3	3	6
Martial arts – Taekwondo	1	1	2
Martial arts – Wushu	7	4	11
Mind sports – Bridge	9	9	18
Mind sports – Chess	5	5	10
Mind sports – Esports	15	0	15
Modern pentathlon	1	0	1
Roller sports	6	8	14
Rowing	20	13	33
Rugby sevens	0	12	12
Sailing	9	7	16
Sepak takraw	8	8	16
Shooting	17	16	33
Sport climbing	3	4	7
Squash	4	4	8
Table tennis	5	5	10
Tennis – Lawn tennis	5	4	9
Tennis – Soft tennis	5	5	10
Volleyball	14	14	28
Weightlifting	0	2	2
Wrestling	12	6	18
Total	335	326	661

== Aquatics ==
=== Diving ===
The Swimming Federation of India announced a two-member squad for Diving.

Men

Athlete	Event	Preliminaries		Final	
Athlete	Event	Points	Rank	Points	Rank
Hemam London Singh	1 m springboard	—N/a		207.80	12
Hemam London Singh	3 m springboard	207.00	17	Did not advance	
Siddharth Pardeshi	3 m springboard	236.35	16	Did not advance	
Siddharth Pardeshi	10 m platform	234.55	11 Q	268.00	11
Siddharth Pardeshi; Hemam London Singh	3 m synchronized springboard	—N/a		279.87	6

=== Swimming ===
The Swimming Federation of India announced a 21-member squad for Swimming.

Men

Athlete	Event	Heats		Final	
Athlete	Event	Time	Rank	Time	Rank
Sajan Prakash	200 m butterfly	1:58.40	6 Q	1:57.44	5
Aneesh Gowda	200 m butterfly	2:05.21	13	Did not advance	
Srihari Nataraj	50 m backstroke	25.43	6 Q	25.39	6
Srihari Nataraj	100m backstroke	54.71	5 Q	54.48	6
Utkarsh Patil	100m backstroke	59.42	20	Did not advance	
Srihari Nataraj	200 m backstroke	2:07.19	15	Did not advance	
Advait Page	200 m backstroke	2:03.01	7 Q	2:02.67	7
Likith S. P.	100 m breaststroke	1:01.98	8 Q	1:01.62	7
Virdhawal Khade	50 m butterfly	24.67	19	Did not advance	
Virdhawal Khade	50 m freestyle	23.12	13	Did not advance	
Anand A. S.	50 m freestyle	23.54	18	Did not advance	
Anand A. S.	100 m freestyle	50.94	17	Did not advance	
Tanish George	100 m freestyle	50.61	12	Did not advance	
Tanish George	200 m freestyle	1:52.39	19	Did not advance	
Srihari Nataraj	200 m freestyle	1:49.05	10	Did not advance	
Kushagra Rawat	400 m freestyle	4:01.24	17	Did not advance	
Aryan Nehra	400 m freestyle	3:58.18	11	Did not advance	
Aryan Nehra	800 m freestyle	—N/a		8:04.06	7
Kushagra Rawat	800 m freestyle	—N/a		8:14.01	11
Kushagra Rawat	1500 m freestyle	—N/a		15:44.61	8
Aryan Nehra	1500 m freestyle	—N/a		15:20.91 NR	7
Srihari Nataraj; Tanish George; Anand A. S. Vishal Grewal	4 × 100 m freestyle relay	3:21.22	5 Q	3:21.46	6
Aryan Nehra; Kushagra Rawat; Tanish George; Aneesh Gowda	4 × 200 m freestyle relay	7:29.04	6 Q	7:29.23	7
Srihari Nataraj; Likith S. P. Tanish George; Sajan Prakash	4 × 100 m medley relay	3:40.84 NR	4 Q	3:40.20 NR	5

Women

Athlete	Event	Heats		Final	
Athlete	Event	Time	Rank	Time	Rank
Nina Venkatesh	50 m butterfly	27:80	14	Did not advance	
Nina Venkatesh	100 m butterfly	1:03.89	14	Did not advance	
Maana Patel	50 m backstroke	30.06	18	Did not advance	
Maana Patel	100 m backstroke	1:03.55	13	Did not advance	
Palak Joshi	200 m backstroke	2:25.81	14	Did not advance	
Lineysha A K	100 m breaststroke	1:15.60	18	Did not advance	
Shivangi Sarma	50 m freestyle	26.92	18	Did not advance	
Shivangi Sarma	100 m freestyle	58.31	17	Did not advance	
Dhinidhi Desinghu	200 m freestyle	2:07.10	12	Did not advance	
Hashika Ramchandra	200 m medley	2:28.29	16	Did not advance	
Vritti Agarwal	800 m freestyle	9:15.99	13	Did not advance	
Maana Patel; Shivangi Sarma; Janhvi Choudhary; Dhinidhi Desinghu	4 × 100 m freestyle relay	3:53.80	6 Q	3:54.66	7
Dhinidhi Desinghu; Hashika Ramchandra; Vritti Agarwal; Shivangi Sarma	4 × 200 m freestyle relay	8:39.64	8 Q	8:37.58	8
Palak Joshi; Hashika Ramchandra; Janhvi Choudhary; Vritti Agarwal	4 × 100 m medley relay	4:23.46	9	Did not advance	

== Archery ==
=== Compound ===
Individual

Athlete	Event	Ranking Round		Round of 64	Round of 32	Round of 16	Quarterfinals	Semi-finals	Final / B.M.	
Athlete	Event	Score	Seed	Opposition Score	Opposition Score	Opposition Score	Opposition Score	Opposition Score	Opposition Score	Rank
Ojas Deotale	Men	709	3	—	Al-Shatti (KUW); W 148–138	Chen C-l (TPE); W 146–145	Karabayev (KAZ); W 150–142 GR	Yang J-w (KOR); W 150–146 GR	Verma (IND); W 149–147	1st place, gold medalist(s)
Abhishek Verma	Men	708	4	—	Al-Awadi (KSA); W 147–139	Nguyễn V Đ (VIE); W 146–142	Tyutyun (KAZ); W 147^{10+}–147^{10}	Joo J-h (KOR); W 147–145	Deotale (IND); L 147–149	2nd place, silver medalist(s)
Rajat Chauhan	Men	698	16	Did not advance						
Prathamesh Jawkar	Men	700	10	Did not advance						
Avneet Kaur	Women	685	15	Did not advance						
Jyothi Surekha	Women	704	1	—	Wijesinghe (SRI); W 145–132	Saad (IRQ); W 146–141	Zhexenbinova (KAZ); W 147–144	Swami (IND); W 149–146	So C-w (KOR); W 149–145	1st place, gold medalist(s)
Aditi Swami	Women	696	4	—	Rai (NEP); W 149–137 GR	Khoerunisa (INA); W 148–146	Cojuangco (PHI); W 149–143	Surekha (IND); L 146–149	Fadhly (INA); W 146–140	3rd place, bronze medalist(s)
Parneet Kaur	Women	687	12	Did not advance						

Team

Athlete	Event	Ranking Round		Round of 16	Quarterfinals	Semi-finals	Final / B.M.	
Athlete	Event	Score	Seed	Opposition Score	Opposition Score	Opposition Score	Opposition Score	Rank
Abhishek Verma; Ojas Deotale; Prathamesh Jawkar	Men	2117	2	Singapore (SGP); W 235–219	Bhutan (BHU); W 235–221	Chinese Taipei (TPE); W 235–224	South Korea (KOR); W 235–230	1st place, gold medalist(s)
Aditi Swami; Jyothi Surekha; Parneet Kaur	Women	2087	1	—	Hong Kong (HKG); W 231–220	Indonesia (INA); W 233–219	Chinese Taipei (TPE); W 230–228	1st place, gold medalist(s)
Jyothi Surekha; Ojas Deotale	Mixed	1413 GR	1	United Arab Emirates (UAE); W 159–151 GR	Malaysia (MAS); W 158–155	Kazakhstan (KAZ); W 159–154	South Korea (KOR); W 159–158	1st place, gold medalist(s)

=== Recurve ===
Individual

Athlete	Event	Ranking Round		Round of 64	Round of 32	Round of 16	Quarterfinals	Semi-finals	Final / B.M.	
Athlete	Event	Score	Seed	Opposition Score	Opposition Score	Opposition Score	Opposition Score	Opposition Score	Opposition Score	Rank
Tushar Shelke	Men	669	15	Did not advance						
Mrinal Chauhan	Men	667	17	Did not advance						
Dhiraj Bommadevara	Men	675	7	—	Dorji (BHU); W 6–2	Rubel (BAN); W 6^{10}–5^{8}	Abdullin (KAZ); L 5^{9}–6^{10}	Did not advance		
Atanu Das	Men	678	4	—	Mohamad (MAS); W 6–4	Nam (TJK); W 7–1	Qi Xs (CHN); L 5^{10}–6^{10+}	Did not advance		
Prachi Singh	Women	593	55	Did not advance						
Ankita Bhakat	Women	649	14	—	Octavia (INA); L 5^{9}–6^{10}	Did not advance				
Bhajan Kaur	Women	640	18	Al-Husaini (YEM); W 6–0	Shimu (BAN); W 6–0	An S (KOR); L 3–7	Did not advance			
Simranjeet Kaur	Women	640	19	Did not advance						

Team

Athlete	Event	Ranking Round		Round of 16	Quarterfinals	Semi-finals	Final / B.M.	
Athlete	Event	Score	Seed	Opposition Score	Opposition Score	Opposition Score	Opposition Score	Rank
Atanu Das; Dhiraj Bommadevara; Tushar Shelke	Men	2022	3	Hong Kong (HKG); W 6–0	Mongolia (MGL); W 5^{28}–4^{25}	Bangladesh (BAN); W 5–3	South Korea (KOR); L 1–5	2nd place, silver medalist(s)
Ankita Bhakat; Bhajan Kaur; Simranjeet Kaur	Women	1929	5	Thailand (THA); W 5–1	Japan (JPN); W 6–2	South Korea (KOR); L 2–6	Vietnam (VIE); W 6–2	3rd place, bronze medalist(s)
Ankita Bhakat; Atanu Das	Mixed	1327	5	Malaysia (MAS); W 6–2	Indonesia (INA); L 4^{19}–5^{20}	Did not advance		

== Athletics ==
=== Men ===
Track Events

Athlete	Event	Heats		Semi-final		Final	
Athlete	Event	Result	Rank	Result	Rank	Result	Rank
Amlan Borgohain	200 m	21.08	3 Q	21.03	5 q	20.98	6
Muhammad Ajmal	400 m	45.76	2 Q	—N/a		45.97	5
Muhammed Anas	400 m	46.29	3	—N/a		Did not advance	
Krishan Kumar	800 m	1:49.45	2 Q	—N/a		DSQ	
Mohammed Afsal	800 m	1:46.79	1 Q	—N/a		1:48.43	2nd place, silver medalist(s)
Ajay Kumar Saroj	1,500 m	3:51.93	2 Q	—N/a		3:38.94	2nd place, silver medalist(s)
Jinson Johnson	1,500 m	3:56.22	5 Q	—N/a		3:39.74	3rd place, bronze medalist(s)
Avinash Sable	5,000 m	—N/a				13:21.09	2nd place, silver medalist(s)
Gulveer Singh	5,000 m	—N/a				13:29.93 PB	4
Gulveer Singh	10,000 m	—N/a				28:17.21 PB	3rd place, bronze medalist(s)
Kartik Kumar	10,000 m	—N/a				28:15.38 PB	2nd place, silver medalist(s)
Yashas Palaksha	400 m hurdles	49.61	2 Q	—N/a		49.39	5
Santhosh Kumar	400 m hurdles	49.28	2 Q	—N/a		49.41	6
Avinash Sable	3,000 m Steeplechase	—N/a				8:19.50 GR	1st place, gold medalist(s)
Amoj Jacob; Rajesh Ramesh; Mohammad Anas; Muhammad Ajmal	4 × 400 m relay	3:03.81	1 Q	—N/a		3:01.58	1st place, gold medalist(s)

Field Events

Athlete	Event	Qualification		Final	
Athlete	Event	Result	Rank	Result	Rank
Sarvesh Kushare	High Jump	2.10	9 q	2.26 SB	4
Jesse Sandesh	High Jump	2.10	9 q	2.19	9
Murali Sreeshankar	Long Jump	7.97	2 Q	8.19	2nd place, silver medalist(s)
Jeswin Aldrin	Long Jump	7.67	6 q	7.76	8
Abdulla Aboobacker	Triple Jump	—N/a		16.47	4
Praveen Chithravel	Triple Jump	—N/a		16.68	3rd place, bronze medalist(s)
Neeraj Chopra	Javelin Throw	—N/a		88.88 SB	1st place, gold medalist(s)
Kishore Jena	Javelin Throw	—N/a		87.54 PB	2nd place, silver medalist(s)
Tajinderpal Singh Toor	Shot Put	—N/a		20.36	1st place, gold medalist(s)
Sahib Singh	Shot Put	—N/a		18.62	8

Road Events

Athlete	Event	Final	
Athlete	Event	Result	Rank
Man Singh	Marathon	2:16:59	8
Appachangada Belliappa	Marathon	2:20:52	12
Vikash Singh	20 km walk	1:27:33	5
Sandeep Kumar	20 km walk	DSQ	

Combined Events

Athlete	Event	Category	100 m	LJ	SP	HJ	400 m	110H	DT	PV	JT	1,500 m	Total	Rank
Tejaswin Shankar	Decathlon	Result	11.12 PB	7.37	13.39 SB	2.21 SB	49.67	14.78	39.28 PB	4.10 PB	51.17	4:48.32	7666 PB NR	2nd place, silver medalist(s)
Tejaswin Shankar	Decathlon	Points	834	903	691	1002	830	876	650	645	606	629	7666 PB NR	2nd place, silver medalist(s)

=== Women ===
Track Events

Athlete	Event	Heats		Semi-final		Final	
Athlete	Event	Result	Rank	Result	Rank	Result	Rank
Jyothi Yarraji	200 m	23.78	3	Did not advance			
Himanshi Malik	400 m	57.82	4	—N/a		Did not advance	
Aishwarya Mishra	400 m	52.73 SB	2 Q	—N/a		53.50	4
K. M. Chanda	800 m	2:07.38	1 Q	—N/a		2:05.69	7
Harmilan Bains	800 m	2:06.62	1 Q	—N/a		2:03.75	2nd place, silver medalist(s)
K. M. Deeksha	1,500 m	—N/a				4:27.77	9
Harmilan Bains	1,500 m	—N/a				4:12.74	2nd place, silver medalist(s)
Parul Chaudhary	5,000 m	—N/a				15:14.75	1st place, gold medalist(s)
Ankita Dhyani	5,000 m	—N/a				15:33.03 PB	5
Jyothi Yarraji	100 m Hurdles	13.03	2 Q	—N/a		12.91	2nd place, silver medalist(s)
Nithya Ramraj	100 m Hurdles	13.30	8 q	—N/a		13.40	7
Vithya Ramraj	400 m Hurdles	55.42 PB	1 Q	—N/a		55.68	3rd place, bronze medalist(s)
Sinchal Kaveramma	400 m Hurdles	58.62	5	Did not advance			
Parul Chaudhary	3,000 m Steeplechase	—N/a				9:27.63 PB	2nd place, silver medalist(s)
Priti Lamba	3,000 m Steeplechase	—N/a				9:43.32 PB	3rd place, bronze medalist(s)
Vithya Ramraj; Subha Venkatesan; Aishwarya Mishra; Prachi Choudhary	4×400 m	—N/a				3:27.85	2nd place, silver medalist(s)

Field Events

Athlete	Event	Result	Rank
Rubina Yadav	High Jump	1.75	9
Pooja Singh	High Jump	1.80	6
Ancy Sojan	Long Jump	6.63 PB	2nd place, silver medalist(s)
Shaili Singh	Long Jump	6.48	5
Sheena Varkey	Triple Jump	13.34	6
Annu Rani	Javelin Throw	62.92 SB	1st place, gold medalist(s)
Kiran Baliyan	Shot Put	17.36	3rd place, bronze medalist(s)
Manpreet Kaur	Shot Put	16.25	5
K. M. Rachna	Hammer Throw	58.13	9
Tanya Chaudhary	Hammer Throw	60.50	7
Pavithra Venkatesh	Pole Vault	4.00	6
Seema Punia	Discus Throw	58.62 SB	3rd place, bronze medalist(s)

Combined Events

Athlete	Event	Category	100H	HJ	SP	200 m	LJ	JT	800 m	Total	Rank
Swapna Barman	Heptathlon	Result	13.88 PB	1.70	12.27	26.16	5.71	45.13	2:16.74 SB	5708	4
Swapna Barman	Heptathlon	Points	995	855	679	783	762	766	868	5708	4
Agasara Nandini	Heptathlon	Result	14.01	1.61	12.11	24.47 PB	5.94 SB	39.88 PB	2:15.33 PB	5712 PB	3rd place, bronze medalist(s)
Agasara Nandini	Heptathlon	Points	977	747	668	936	834	665	888	5712 PB	3rd place, bronze medalist(s)

Road Events

Athlete	Event	Final	
Athlete	Event	Result	Rank
Priyanka Goswami	20 km race walk	1:43:07	5

=== Mixed ===
Athlete	Event	Final	
Athlete	Event	Result	Rank
Muhammad Ajmal; Vithya Ramraj; Rajesh Ramesh; Subha Venkatesan	4×400 m relay	3:14.34 NR	2nd place, silver medalist(s)
Ram Baboo; Manju Rani	35 km race walk	5:51:14	3rd place, bronze medalist(s)

== Badminton ==
Badminton Association of India held trials at Jwala Gutta Academy of Excellence, Moinabad, Telangana from 4 to 7 May 2023. The final list of 19 athletes was announced by BAI on 7 May 2023.

=== Men ===
Athlete	Event	Round of 64	Round of 32	Round of 16	Quarterfinals	Semi-finals	Final	
Athlete	Event	Opposition Score	Opposition Score	Opposition Score	Opposition Score	Opposition Score	Opposition Score	Rank
Prannoy H. S.	Singles	Bye	Munkhbat (MGL); W (21–9, 21–12)	Panarin (KAZ); W (21–12, 21–13)	Lee Z J (MAS); W (21–16, 21–23, 22–20)	Li Sf (CHN); L (16–21, 9–21)	Did not advance	3rd place, bronze medalist(s)
Srikanth Kidambi	Singles	Lê D P (VIE); W (21–10, 21–9)	Lee Y-g (KOR); W (21–16, 21–11)	Naraoka (JPN); L (16–21, 17–21)	Did not advance			
Chirag Shetty; Satwiksairaj Rankireddy	Doubles	—N/a	Chow H L / Lui C W (HKG); W (21–11, 21–16)	Carnando / Marthin (INA); W (24–22,16–21, 21–12)	Nge J J / Prajogo (SGP); W (21–7, 21–9)	Chia / Soh W Y (MAL); W (21–17, 21–12)	Choi S-g / Kim W-h (KOR); W (21–18, 21–16)	1st place, gold medalist(s)
Arjun M.R. Dhruv Kapila	Doubles	—N/a	Hoki / Kobayashi (JPN); L RET	Did not advance				
Lakshya Sen; Srikanth Kidambi; Prannoy H. S. Mithun Manjunath; Chirag Shetty; Satwiksairaj Rankireddy; Arjun M.R. Dhruv Kapila; Rohan Kapoor; K. Sai Pratheek	Team	—N/a		Bye	Nepal (NEP); W 3–0	South Korea (KOR); W 3–2	China (CHN); L 2–3	2nd place, silver medalist(s)

=== Women ===
Athlete	Event	Round of 64	Round of 32	Round of 16	Quarterfinals	Semi-finals	Final	
Athlete	Event	Opposition Score	Opposition Score	Opposition Score	Opposition Score	Opposition Score	Opposition Score	Rank
P. V. Sindhu	Singles	Bye	Hsu W-c (TPE); W (21–10, 21–15)	Wardani (INA); W (21–16, 21–16)	He Bj (CHN); L (16–21, 12–21)	Did not advance		
Ashmita Chaliha	Singles	Bye	Tunjung (INA); L (17–21, 16–21)	Did not advance				
Treesa Jolly; Gayatri Gopichand	Doubles	—N/a	A. Razzaq / F. Razzaq (MDV); W (21–14, 21–12)	Kim S-y / Kong H-y (KOR); L (15–21, 21–18, 13–21)	Did not advance			
Tanisha Crasto; Ashwini Ponnappa	Doubles	—N/a	Ismail / Rasheed (MDV); W (21–2, 12–2) RET	Zhang Sx / Zheng Y (CHN); L (13–21, 21–23)	Did not advance			
P. V. Sindhu; Ashmita Chaliha; Anupama Upadhyaya; Malvika Bansod; Tanisha Crasto; Gayatri Gopichand; Treesa Jolly; Ashwini Ponnappa; N. Sikki Reddy	Team	—N/a		Mongolia (MGL); W 3–0	Thailand (THA); L 0–3	Did not advance		

=== Mixed ===
Athlete	Event	Round of 32	Round of 16	Quarterfinals	Semi-finals	Final	
Athlete	Event	Opposition Score	Opposition Score	Opposition Score	Opposition Score	Opposition Score	Rank
Rohan Kapoor; N. Sikki Reddy	Doubles	Goh S H / Lai (MAS); L RET	Did not advance				
K. Sai Pratheek; Tanisha Crasto	Doubles	Leong I C / Ng W C (MAC); W (21–18, 21–14)	Chen T J/ Toh E W (MAS); L (18–21, 18–21)	Did not advance			

== Basketball ==
Basketball Federation of India selected a 20-member squad for Basketball events.

=== 3×3 basketball ===
Team	Event	Group stage				Qualifications	Quarterfinal	Semi-finals / Pl.	Final / BM / Pl.
Team	Event	Opposition Score	Opposition Score	Opposition Score	Rank	Opposition Score	Opposition Score	Opposition Score	Rank
India men's	Men's tournament	Malaysia; W 20–16	Macau; W 21–12	China; L 15–18	2 Q	Iran; L 17–19	Did not advance		
India women's	Women's tournament	Uzbekistan; L 14–19	China; L 8–22	—N/a	3 Q	Malaysia; W 16–6	Chinese Taipei; L 10–21	Did not advance	

Men's tournament

Squad

1. Sahaij Sekhon
2. Princepal Singh
3. Pranav Prince
4. Lokendra Singh

Group C

Pos	Team	Pld	W	L	PF	PA	PD	Qualification
1	China	3	3	0	60	36	+24	Quarterfinals
2	India	3	2	1	56	46	+10	Qualification for quarterfinals
3	Macau	3	1	2	49	59	−10	Qualification for quarterfinals
4	Malaysia	3	0	3	38	62	−24	

Source: FIBA

25 September
14:40

Malaysia	16–20	India
Pts: Lim 10		Pts: Sekhon 10

Deqing Geographic Information Park, Huzhou
Referees: Rulyov (KAZ), Ibragimow (TKM)

27 September
14:40

Macau	12–21	India
Pts: Ho 5		Pts: Sekhon 10

Deqing Geographic Information Park, Huzhou
Referees: Su (TPE), Ibragimow (TKM)

29 September
19:50

India	15–18	China
Pts: Prince 6		Pts: Zhao 10

Deqing Geographic Information Park, Huzhou
Referees: Ibragimow (TKM), Liu (MAS)

30 September
13:25

India	17–19	Iran
Pts: P. Singh 9		Pts: Yazarloo 7

Deqing Geographic Information Park, Huzhou
Referees: Liu (MAS), Rulyov (KAZ)

Women's tournament

Squad

1. Anumaria Shaju
2. Siya Deodhar
3. Yashneet Kaur
4. Vaishnavi Yadav

Group A

Pos	Team	Pld	W	L	PF	PA	PD	Qualification
1	China	2	2	0	43	12	+31	Quarterfinals
2	Uzbekistan	2	1	1	23	35	−12	Qualification for quarterfinals
3	India	2	0	2	22	41	−19	Qualification for quarterfinals

Source: FIBA

25 September
13:50

India	14–19	Uzbekistan
Pts: Yadav 9		Pts: Jalilova, Tsoy 8

Deqing Geographic Information Park, Huzhou
Referees: Nagoshi (JPN), Burmaa (MGL)

27 September
19:25

China	22–8	India
Pts: Chen 8		Pts: Yadav 6

Deqing Geographic Information Park, Huzhou
Referees: Soliman (QAT), Nagoshi (JPN)

30 September
15:30

Malaysia	6–16	India
Pts: Tan Y. 3		Pts: Yadav 9

Deqing Geographic Information Park, Huzhou
Referees: Su (TPE), Shi (CHN)

30 September
20:30

Chinese Taipei	21–10	India
Pts: Chen 8		Pts: Yadav 7

Deqing Geographic Information Park, Huzhou
Referees: Rulyov (KAZ), Burmaa (MGL)

=== 5×5 basketball ===
Team	Event	Group stage				Quarterfinal	Semi-finals / Pl.	Final / BM / Pl.	
Team	Event	Opposition Score	Opposition Score	Opposition Score	Rank	Opposition Score	Opposition Score	Opposition Score	Rank
India women's	Women's tournament	Indonesia; W 66–46	Mongolia; W 68–62	China; L 53–111	2 Q	North Korea; L 57–96	Did not advance		

Squad

1. Manmeet Kaur
2. Anmolpreet Kaur
3. Poonam Chaturvedi
4. Madhu Kumari
5. Sheerin Limaye
6. Bhandavya Mahesha
7. Sanjana Ramesh
8. Sreekala Rani
9. Sruthy Rathinavel
10. Pushpa Senthil Kumar
11. Kavitha Jose
12. Sahana Shivamogga Mohan

Group A

Pos	Team	Pld	W	L	PF	PA	PD	Pts	Qualification
1	China	3	3	0	313	151	+162	6	Quarterfinals
2	India	3	2	1	187	219	−32	5	Quarterfinals
3	Indonesia	3	1	2	167	231	−64	4	Quarterfinals
4	Mongolia	3	0	3	172	238	−66	3	

Source: OCA

27 September
20:00

Report

India	66–46	Indonesia
Scoring by quarter: 18–14, 11–11, 9–11, 28–10
Pts: Kumar 18; Rebs: Rathinavel 14; Asts: Limaye, Ramesh 4		Pts: Pierre-Louis 15; Rebs: Pierre-Louis 12; Asts: Gradita 7

Olympic Center Gymnasium, Shaoxing
Referees: Wissam Zein (SYR), Huang Yun-hsuan (TPE), Mohamed Al-Salam (BRN)

29 September
20:00

Report

Mongolia	62–68	India
Scoring by quarter: 16–19, 15–20, 13–16, 18–13
Pts: Bulbul 21; Rebs: Bolor-Erdene 12; Asts: Önörzayaa 9		Pts: Kumar 30; Rebs: Kumar 12; Asts: Limaye 7

Olympic Center Gymnasium, Shaoxing
Referees: Wissam Zein (SYR), Kim Bo-hui (KOR), Taha Al-Hashedi (YEM)

1 October
20:00

Report

China	111–53	India
Scoring by quarter: 38–7, 20–19, 32–13, 21–14
Pts: Li Yue. 25; Rebs: Li Yue. 10; Asts: Wang 8		Pts: Kumar, Ramesh 14; Rebs: Kumar 11; Asts: Limaye 3

Olympic Expo Center Gymnasium, Hangzhou
Referees: Kim Bo-hui (KOR), Bandar Al-Suwaidi (QAT), Tee Yong Sern (MAS)

2 October
16:00

Report

India	57–96	North Korea
Scoring by quarter: 20–26, 6–26, 17–22, 14–22
Pts: Rani 16; Rebs: Kumar 6 Asts: Kumar, A. Kaur, Rani 2		Pts: Hong, Pak J. 29; Rebs: Pak J. 10; Asts: Ro 13

Olympic Center Gymnasium, Shaoxing
Referees: Yu Yijing (CHN), Yana Nikogossyan (KAZ), Song Houlu (CHN)

== Boxing ==
Boxing Federation of India announced the 13-member squad for the Asian Games.

=== Men ===
Athlete	Event	Round of 32	Round of 16	Quarterfinals	Semi-finals	Final	Rank
Athlete	Event	Opposition Result	Opposition Result	Opposition Result	Opposition Result	Opposition Result	Rank
Deepak Bhoria	51 kg	Qayum (MAS); W 5–0	Tsuboi (JPN); L 1–4	Did not advance			
Sachin Siwach	57 kg	Asri (INA); W 5–0	Abuquthailah (KUW); W WO	Lyu P (CHN); L 1–4	Did not advance		
Shiva Thapa	63.5 kg	Bye	Kultaev (KGZ); L 0–5	Did not advance			
Nishant Dev	71 kg	Lama (NEP); W 5–0	Bùi P T (VIE); W KO	Okazawa (JPN); L 0–5	Did not advance		
Lakshya Chahar	80 kg	—N/a	Bekzhigit (KGZ); L 1–4	Did not advance			
Sanjeet Kumar	92 kg	—N/a	Mullojonov (UZB); L 0–5	Did not advance			
Narender Berwal	+92 kg	—N/a	Elchoro-Uulu (KGZ); W KO	Ramezanpour (IRI); W 5–0	Kunkabayev (KAZ); L 0–5	Did not advance	3rd place, bronze medalist(s)

=== Women ===
Athlete	Event	Round of 32	Round of 16	Quarterfinals	Semi-finals	Final	Rank
Athlete	Event	Opposition Result	Opposition Result	Opposition Result	Opposition Result	Opposition Result	Rank
Nikhat Zareen	50 kg	Nguyễn T T (VIE); W 5–0	Bak C-r (KOR); W 5–0	Nassar (JOR); W RSC	Raksat (THA); L 2–3	Did not advance	3rd place, bronze medalist(s)
Preeti Pawar	54 kg	—N/a	Alhasanat (JOR); W RSC	Shekerbekova (KAZ); W 4–1	Chang Ya (CHN); L 0–5	Did not advance	3rd place, bronze medalist(s)
Parveen Hooda	57 kg	—N/a	Xu Zc (CHN); W 5–0	Turdibekova (UZB); W 5–0	Lin Y-t (TPE); L 0–5	Did not advance	Medal Suspended
Jaismine Lamboria	60 kg	—N/a	Ashour (KSA); W RSC	Won U-g (PRK); L RSC	Did not advance		
Arundhati Chaudhary	66 kg	—N/a	Yang L (CHN); L 0–5	Did not advance			
Lovlina Borgohain	75 kg	—N/a	Bye	Seong S-y (KOR); W 5–0	Manikon (THA); W 5–0	Li Q (CHN); L 0–5	2nd place, silver medalist(s)

== Canoeing ==
=== Slalom ===
Athlete	Event	Heat1		Heat2		Semi-final		Final	
Athlete	Event	Score	Rank	Score	Rank	Score	Rank	Score	Rank
Hitesh Kewat	Men's K-1	116.24	10	119.03	3 Q	123.68	10 Q	130.34	7
Shubham Kewat	Men's K-1	137.96	11	122.98	4 Q	136.01	11	Did not advance	
Vishal Kewat	Men's C-1	144.09	11	131.14	4 Q	134.15	10 Q	239.15	7
Shikha Chouhan	Women's K-1	130.27	7	153.83	3 Q	185.23	6 Q	227.24	6

=== Sprint ===
Men

Athlete	Event	Heats		Semi-final		Final	
Athlete	Event	Time	Rank	Time	Rank	Time	Rank
Niraj Verma	C-1 1000m	4:25.162	6 SF	4:31.626	1 Q	4:36.314	7
Ribason Singh Ningthoujam; Gyaneshwar Singh Philem	C-2 500m	1:54.829	4 SF	1:57.225	3 Q	1:54.723	8
Arjun Singh; Sunil Singh Salam	C-2 1000m	—N/a				3:53.529	3rd place, bronze medalist(s)

Women

Athlete	Event	Heats		Semi-final		Final	
Athlete	Event	Time	Rank	Time	Rank	Time	Rank
Megha Pradeep	C-1 200m	56.705	5 SF	55.406	4	Did not advance	
Neha Devi Leichondam; Kaveri Dimar	C-2 200m	—N/a				51.479	8
Megha Pradeep; Shivani Verma	C-2 500m	—N/a				2:17.614	9
Soniya Devi Phairembam	K-1 500m	2:17.351	4 SF	2:16.435	2 Q	2:14.555	8
Binita Chanu Oinam; Parvathy Geetha	K-2 500m	2:06.956	4 SF	2:07.036	2 Q	2:07.440	9
Binita Chanu Oinam; Parvathy Geetha; Dimita Devi Toijam; Soniya Devi Phairembam	K-4 500m	—N/a				1:55.420	8

== Cricket ==
Board of Control for Cricket in India announced both the men's and women's squads on 14 July 2023.

Team	Event	Group stage			Quarterfinal	Semi-final	Final / BM	
Team	Event	Opposition Result	Opposition Result	Rank	Opposition Result	Opposition Result	Opposition Result	Rank
India women's	Women's tournament	Bye			Malaysia; W (Note: India declared winner by virtue of its higher seeding) NR	Bangladesh; W by 8 wickets	Sri Lanka; W by 19 runs	1st place, gold medalist(s)
India men's	Men's tournament	Bye			Nepal; W by 23 runs	Bangladesh; W by 9 wickets	Afghanistan; W NR	1st place, gold medalist(s)

=== Women's tournament ===
Coach
(India) Hrishikesh Kanitkar
Squad

1. Harmanpreet Kaur (Captain)
2. Smriti Mandhana (Vice Captain)
3. Shafali Verma
4. Jemimah Rodrigues
5. Deepti Sharma
6. Richa Ghosh (wk)
7. Amanjot Kaur
8. Devika Vaidya
9. Pooja Vastrakar
10. Titas Sadhu
11. Rajeshwari Gayakwad
12. Minnu Mani
13. Kanika Ahuja
14. Uma Chetry (wk)
15. Anusha Bareddy

Standby players

1. Harleen Deol
2. Kashvee Gautam
3. Sneh Rana
4. Saika Ishaque

Quarter-final

21 September
9:00
Scorecard

India; 173/2 (15 overs)	v	Malaysia; 1/0 (0.2 overs)
Shafali Verma 67 (39); Mas Elysa 1/26 (2 overs)		Ainna Hamizah Hashim 1* (1)

No result
ZJUT Cricket Field, Hangzhou
Umpires: Asif Yaqoob (PAK) and Anand Natarajan (SGP)

- Malaysia won the toss and elected to field.
- The match was reduced to 15 overs per side due to rain. Rain also prevented any further play in the second innings.
- India won by virtue of being the higher-seeded team.

Semi-final

24 September
9:00
Scorecard

Bangladesh; 51 (17.5 overs)	v	India; 52/2 (8.2 overs)
Nigar Sultana 12 (17); Pooja Vastrakar 4/17 (4 overs)		Jemimah Rodrigues 20* (15); Fahima Khatun 1/7 (1 over)

India won by 8 wickets
ZJUT Cricket Field, Hangzhou
Umpires: Asif Yaqoob (PAK) and Sarika Prasad (SGP)

- Bangladesh won the toss and elected to bat.

Final

25 September
14:00
Scorecard

India; 116/7 (20 overs)	v	Sri Lanka; 97/8 (20 overs)
Smriti Mandhana 46 (45); Udeshika Prabodhani 2/16 (3 overs)		Hasini Perera 25 (22); Titas Sadhu 3/6 (4 overs)

India won by 19 runs
ZJUT Cricket Field, Hangzhou
Umpires: Masudur Rahman (BAN) and Mahmood Kharoti (AFG)

- India won the toss and elected to bat.

=== Men's tournament ===
Coach
(India) VVS Laxman
Squad

1. Ruturaj Gaikwad (Captain)
2. Yashasvi Jaiswal
3. Rahul Tripathi
4. Tilak Varma
5. Rinku Singh
6. Jitesh Sharma (wk)
7. Washington Sundar
8. Shahbaz Ahmed
9. Ravi Bishnoi
10. Avesh Khan
11. Arshdeep Singh
12. Mukesh Kumar
13. Shivam Dube
14. Prabhsimran Singh (wk)
15. Sai Kishore

Standby players

1. Yash Thakur
2. Venkatesh Iyer
3. Deepak Hooda
4. Sai Sudharsan

Quarter-final

3 October
9:00
Scorecard

India; 202/4 (20 overs)	v	Nepal; 179/9 (20 overs)
Yashasvi Jaiswal 100 (49); Dipendra Singh Airee 2/31 (4 overs)		Dipendra Singh Airee 32 (15); Ravi Bishnoi 3/24 (4 overs)

India won by 23 runs
ZJUT Cricket Field, Hangzhou
Umpires: Mahmood Kharoti (AFG) and Asif Yaqoob (PAK)

- India won the toss and elected to bat.

Semi-final

6 October
9:00
Scorecard

Bangladesh; 96/9 (20 overs)	v	India; 97/1 (9.2 overs)
Jaker Ali 24* (29); Sai Kishore 3/12 (4 overs)		Tilak Varma 55* (26); Ripon Mondol 1/26 (2 overs)

India won by 9 wickets
ZJUT Cricket Field, Hangzhou
Umpires: Asif Yaqoob (PAK) and Mahmood Kharoti (AFG)

- India won the toss and elected to field.

Final

7 October 2023
14:00
Scorecard

Afghanistan; 112/5 (18.2 overs)	v	India
Shahidullah 49* (43); Shivam Dube 1/4 (1 over)

No result
Zhejiang University of Technology Cricket Field, Hangzhou
Umpires: Ruchira Palliyaguruge (SL) and Masudur Rahman (BAN)

- India won the toss and elected to field.
- No further play was possible due to rain.
- Zubaid Akbari (AFG) made his T20I debut.
- India awarded the gold medal on seeding.

== Cycling ==
=== Track ===
Pursuit

Athlete	Event	Qualification		Final	
Athlete	Event	Time	Rank	Opponent Results	Rank
Dinesh Kumar; Vishwajeet Singh; Venkappa Kengalagutti; Manjeet Kumar	Men's Team	4:16.085	7	4:19.144	6

Keirin

Athlete	Event	First round	Repechage	Semi-final	Final/F7-12
Athlete	Event	Rank	Rank	Rank	Rank
Esow Alben	Men's individual	DNF R	3 Q	6	10
David Elkatohchoongo	Men's individual	2 Q	—N/a	5	11
Shushikala Agashe	Women's Individual	5 R	5	Did not advance	
Triyasha Paul	Women's Individual	3 R	6	Did not advance	

Sprint

Athlete	Event	Qualification		Round of 32	Round of 16	Repechage	Quarterfinals	Semi-finals	Final/F5-8	
Athlete	Event	Time	Rank	Opposition Time	Opposition Time	Opposition Time	Opposition Time	Opposition Time	Opposition Time	Rank
Ronaldo Laitonjam	Men's Individual	71.386	13 Q	Nakano (JPN); L +3.350	—N/a	Chugay (KAZ); L +0.015	Did not advance			
David Elkatohchoongo	Men's Individual	71.785	9 Q	Ponomaryov (KAZ); W −0.188	Sahrom (MAS); L +0.276	Ponomaryov (KAZ); Chugay (KAZ) W −0.061	Ota (JPN); L 0–2	—N/a	+0.109	8
Esow Alben; Ronaldo Laitonjam; David Elkatohchoongo; Rojit Singh Yanglem	Men's Team	45.394	7	Japan (JPN); L 44.609	Did not advance					
Triyasha Paul	Women's Individual	11.616	15 Q	Sato (JPN); L +0.722	—N/a	Hwang H-s (KOR); L +0.056	Did not advance			
Mayuri Lute	Women's Individual	11.787	17	Did not advance						
Celestina Chelobroy; Triyasha Paul; Mayuri Lute; Shushikala Agashe	Women's Team	52.898	7	South Korea (KOR); L 52.333	Did not advance					

Omnium

Athlete	Event	Scratch Race		Tempo Race		Elimination Race		Points Race
Athlete	Event	Rank	Points	Rank	Points	Rank	Points	Points
Neeraj Kumar	Men	9	24	DNF				

Madison

Athlete	Event	Points	Laps	Rank
Harshveer Sekhon	Men's Individual	DNF		8
Neeraj Kumar	Men's Individual	DNF		8

== Equestrian ==
=== Dressage ===
Athlete	Horse	Event	Dressage		Intermediate I		Intermediate I Freestyle	
Athlete	Horse	Event	Overall	Rank	Overall	Rank	Overall	Rank
Anush Agarwalla	Etro	Individual	71.088	2 Q	71.706	4 Q	73.030	3rd place, bronze medalist(s)
Hriday Chheda	Chemxpro Emerald	Individual	69.941	3 Q	73.883	1 Q	EL (Note: eliminated as blood spotted on steed's leg)	
Divyakirti Singh	Adrenalin Firfod	Individual	68.176	8 Q	67.676	11	Did not advance (Note: Only top 2 players from each country can advance to the final)	
Sudipti Hajela	Chinski	Individual	66.706	16 Q	EL		Did not advance	
Anush Agarwalla; Hriday Chheda; Divyakirti Singh; Sudipti Hajela	See above	Team	209.205	1	—N/a			

=== Eventing ===
Athlete	Horse	Event	Dressage	Cross-country	Jumping	Total	Rank
Ashish Limaye	Willy Be Dun	Individual	26.90	EL (Note: eliminated as course was not completed in cross-country)	Did not advance	1000	DNF
Apoorva Dabade	Valtho Des Peulpliers	Individual	29.60	0.00	6.40	36.00	12
Vikas Kumar	Norway Harry	Individual	32.40	8.80	0	41.20	13
Ashish Limaye; Apoorva Dabade; Vikas Kumar	See above	Team	88.90	8.80	6.40	1077.20 (Note: 1000 points against Limaye for elimination)	5

=== Jumping ===
Athlete	Horse	Event	Qualifier 1		Qualifier 2		Final 1		Final 2	
Athlete	Horse	Event	Time	Rank	Time	Rank	Time	Rank	Time	Rank
Kirat Singh Nagra	Alvin B	Individual	EL		Did not advance					
Tejas Dhingra	Stan KJ	Individual	EL		Did not advance					
Yash Nensee	D A Mour Du Wenuphar	Individual	77.72	T30	82.06	T41	86.24	24	EL	
Kirat Singh Nagra; Tejas Dhingra; Yash Nensee	See above	Team	EL		Did not advance					

== Fencing ==
=== Individual ===
Athlete	Event	Preliminaries						Round of 32	Round of 16	Quarterfinals	Semi-finals	Final
Athlete	Event	Opposition Score	Opposition Score	Opposition Score	Opposition Score	Opposition Score	Rank	Opposition Score	Opposition Score	Opposition Score	Opposition Score	Opposition Score
Arjun Dev	Men's Foil	Nguyễn V H (VIE); L 0–5	Ghaith (IRQ); W 5–4	Wakim (LBN); W 5–4	Im C-w (KOR); L 1–5	Choi (HKG); L 3–5	22 Q	Chen Y-t (TPE); L 8–15	Did not advance			
Bibish Kathireshan	Men's Foil	Lock (SGP); L 4–5	Wu C H (MAC); W 5–3	Chen Hw (CHN); L 2–5	Nassar (KUW); L 3–5	Shikine (JPN); L 2–5	23 Q	Au Eong (SGP); W 15–12	Lee K-h (KOR); L 5–15	Did not advance		
Bhavani Devi	Women's Sabre	Heng (SGP); W 5–2	Al-Hammad (KSA); W 5–1	Dospay (KAZ); W 5–3	Dayibekova (UZB); W 5–1	Khatun (BAN); W 5–1	1 Q	Bye	Phokaew (THA); W 15–9	Shao Yq (CHN); L 7–15	Did not advance	
Taniksha Khatri	Women's Épée	Dinoy (PHI); W 5–1	Ochirkhuyag (MGL); W 5–0	Koh (SGP); L 1–5	Alshami (YEM); W 5–1	Song S-r (KOR); L 3–5	12 Q	Arora (IND); W 15–11	Egamberdieva (UZB); W 15–10	Kong (HKG); L 7–15	Did not advance	
Ena Arora	Women's Épée	Sato (JPN); L 3–5	Alahdal (YEM); W 5–1	Pistsova (KAZ); L 2–5	Hsieh (HKG); L 2–3	Abdyl-Khamitova (KGZ); L 4–5	21 Q	Khatri (IND); L 11–15	Did not advance			

=== Team ===
Athlete	Event	Round of 16	Quarterfinals	Semi-finals	Final	
Athlete	Event	Opposition Score	Opposition Score	Opposition Score	Opposition Score	Rank
Arjun Dev; Bibish Kathireshan; Akash Kumar	Men's Foil	Singapore (SGP); L 30–45	Did not advance			
Taniksha Khatri; Ena Arora; Yashkeerat Kaur; Jyotika Dutta	Women's Épée	Jordan (JOR); W 45–36	South Korea (KOR); L 25–45	Did not advance		

== Field hockey ==
Hockey India selected a 36-member squad for the hockey events. By winning the gold medal, the Men's field hockey team qualified for the 2024 Summer Olympics.

Summary

Key:

- P – Match decided by penalty-shootout.

Team	Event	Group stage						Semi-final	Final / BM	
Team	Event	Opposition Score	Opposition Score	Opposition Score	Opposition Score	Opposition Score	Rank	Opposition Score	Opposition Score	Rank
India men's	Men's tournament	Uzbekistan; W 16–0	Singapore; W 16–1	Japan; W 4–2	Pakistan; W 10–2	Bangladesh; W 12–0	1 Q	South Korea; W 5–3	Japan; W 5–1	1st place, gold medalist(s)
India women's	Women's tournament	Singapore; W 13–0	Malaysia; W 6–0	South Korea; D 1–1	Hong Kong; W 13–0	—N/a	1 Q	China; L 0–4	Japan; W 2–1	3rd place, bronze medalist(s)

=== Men's tournament ===
Squad

1. Abhishek Nain
2. Gurjant Singh
3. Hardik Singh
4. Harmanpreet Singh
5. Jarmanpreet Singh
6. Mandeep Singh
7. Manpreet Singh
8. Sanjay Rana
9. Shamsher Singh
10. Sukhjeet Singh
11. Sumit Walmiki
12. P. R. Sreejesh
13. Varun Kumar
14. Krishan Pathak
15. Vivek Prasad
16. Amit Rohidas
17. Nilakanta Sharma
18. Lalit Upadhyay

Pool A

Pos	Team	Pld	W	D	L	GF	GA	GD	Pts	Qualification
1	India	5	5	0	0	58	5	+53	15	Semi-finals
2	Japan	5	4	0	1	36	9	+27	12	Semi-finals
3	Pakistan	5	3	0	2	38	17	+21	9	Fifth place game
4	Bangladesh	5	2	0	3	15	29	−14	6	Seventh place game
5	Uzbekistan	5	1	0	4	7	49	−42	3	Ninth place game
6	Singapore	5	0	0	5	5	50	−45	0	Eleventh place game

Source: FIH
Rules for classification: 1) points; 2) matches won; 3) goal difference; 4) goals for; 5) head-to-head result; 6) field goals for.

24 September 2023
11:15

India	16–0	Uzbekistan
Lalit 7', 24', 53'; Varun 12', 36', 50', 52'; Abhishek 17'; Mandeep 18', 27', 28'; Sukhjeet 37', 42'; Amit 38'; Shamsher 43'; Sanjay 57'	Report

Umpires:
Nazmi Kamaruddin (MAS)
Khamis Al Balushi (OMA)

26 September 2023
09:00

India	16–1	Singapore
Mandeep 12', 30', 51'; Lalit 16'; Gurjant 22'; Vivek 23'; Harmanpreet 24', 39', 40', 42'; Manpreet 37'; Shamsher 38'; Abhishek 51', 52'; Varun 55', 55'	Report	Zulkarnain 53'

Umpires:
Sean Rapaport (RSA)
Chi Gang (CHN)

28 September 2023
20:45

Japan	2–4	India
Kato 60'; Mitani 57'	Report	Abhishek 13', 48'; Mandeep 24'; Amit 34'

Umpires:
Sean Rapaport (RSA)
You Hyo-Sik (KOR)

30 September 2023
20:45

Pakistan	2–10	India
Su. Khan 38'; Afraz 45'	Report	Mandeep 8'; Harmanpreet 11', 17', 33', 34'; Sumit 30'; Varun 41', 54'; Shamsher 46'; Lalit 49'

Umpires:
Lim Hong-Zhen (SGP)
Kamaruddin Nazmi (MAS)

2 October 2023
15:45

India	12–0	Bangladesh
Harmanpreet 2', 4', 32'; Mandeep 18', 24', 46'; Lalit 23'; Amit 28'; Abhishek 41', 57'; Nilakanta 47'; Gurjant 56'	Report

Umpires:
Paul Walker (ENG)
Tao Zhinan (CHN)

Semi–Final

4 October 2023
16:00

India	5–3	South Korea
Hardik 5'; Mandeep 11'; Lalit 15'; Amit 24'; Abhishek 54'	Report	Jung 17', 20', 42'

Umpires:
Lim Hong-Zhen (SGP)
Rawi Anbananthan (MAS)

Final

6 October 2023
18:30

India	5–1	Japan
Manpreet 25'; Harmanpreet 32', 59'; Amit 36'; Abhishek 48'	Report	S. Tanaka 51'

Umpires:
Nazmi Kamaruddin (MAS)
Lim Hong-Zhen (SGP)

=== Women's tournament ===
Squad

1. Deepika Sehrawat
2. Lalremsiami
3. Monika Malik
4. Navneet Kaur
5. Neha Goyal
6. Nisha Warsi
7. Savita Punia
8. Sonika Tandi
9. Udita Duhan
10. Ishika Chaudhary
11. Deep Grace Ekka
12. Vandana Kataria
13. Bichu Devi Kharibam
14. Sangita Kumari
15. Vaishnavi Phalke
16. Salima Tete
17. Nikki Pradhan
18. Sushila Chanu

Pool A

Pos	Team	Pld	W	D	L	GF	GA	GD	Pts	Qualification
1	India	4	3	1	0	33	1	+32	10	Semi-finals
2	South Korea	4	3	1	0	17	1	+16	10	Semi-finals
3	Malaysia	4	2	0	2	16	12	+4	6	Fifth place game
4	Singapore	4	1	0	3	2	25	−23	3	Seventh place game
5	Hong Kong	4	0	0	4	0	29	−29	0	Ninth place game

Source: FIH
Rules for classification: 1) points; 2) matches won; 3) goal difference; 4) goals for; 5) head-to-head result; 6) field goals for.

27 September 2023
12:45

India	13–0	Singapore
Udita 6'; Sushila 8'; Deepika 11'; Navneet 14', 14'; Grace 17'; Neha 19'; Sangita 23', 47', 53'; Salima 35'; Monika 52'; Vandana 56'	Report

Umpires:
Kittiteerasopon Ornpimol (THA)
Liu Xiaoying (CHN)

29 September 2023
18:30

Malaysia	0–6	India
	Report	Monika 7'; Grace 8'; Navneet 25'; Vaishnavi 15'; Sangita 24'; Lalremsiami 50'

Umpires:
Liu Xiaoying (CHN)
Tan Cookie (SGP)

1 October 2023
16:00

South Korea	1–1	India
Cho H. 12'	Report	Navneet 44'

Umpires:
Xiaoying Liu (CHN)
Irene Presenqui (ARG)

3 October 2023
10:15

India	13–0	Hong Kong
Vandana 2', 48'; Deepika 4', 54', 58'; Monika 7'; Grace 11', 42'; Sangita 27', 55'; Vaishnavi 34'; Navneet 58'	Report

Umpires:
Ornpimol Kittiteerasopon (THA)
Binish Hayat (PAK)

Semi–Final

5 October 2023
16:00

India	0–4	China
	Report	Zhong 25'; Zou 40'; Liang 55'; Gu 60'

Umpires:
Annelize Rostron (RSA)
Yoon Seon Kim (KOR)

Bronze medal match

7 October 2023
16:00

India	2–1	Japan
Deepika 5'; Chanu 50'	Report	Y. Nagai 30+'

Umpires:
Liu Xiaoying (CHN)
Kim Yoon Seon (KOR)

== Football ==
All India Football Federation (AIFF) announced a 22-member squad for the men's event on 1 August 2023 and a 22-member squad for the women's event on 25 August 2023. A revised 22-member squad for men's event was announced on 15 September 2023.

Summary

Key:

- A.E.T – After extra time.
- P – Match decided by penalty-shootout.

Team	Event	Group stage				Round of 16	Quarterfinal	Semi-final	Final / BM	
Team	Event	Opposition Score	Opposition Score	Opposition Score	Rank	Opposition Score	Opposition Score	Opposition Score	Opposition Score	Rank
India men's	Men's tournament	China; L 1–5	Bangladesh; W 1–0	Myanmar; D 1–1	2 Q	Saudi Arabia; L 0–2	Did not advance			9
India women's	Women's tournament	Chinese Taipei; L 1–2	Thailand; L 0–1	—N/a	3	Did not advance				

=== Men's tournament ===
Head Coach
(Croatia) Igor Štimac

Squad

1. Gurmeet Singh (GK)
2. Dheeraj Singh Moirangthem (GK)
3. Vishal Yadav
4. Sumit Rathi
5. Narender Gahlot
6. Jeakson Singh
7. Sandesh Jhingan
8. Chinglensana Singh
9. Lalchungnunga
10. Amarjit Singh Kiyam
11. Samuel James Lyngdoh
12. Rahul KP
13. Abdul Rabeeh
14. Ayush Dev Chhetri
15. Bryce Miranda
16. Azfar Noorani
17. Vincy Bareto
18. Sunil Chhetri (Captain)
19. Rahim Ali
20. Rohit Danu
21. Gurkirat Singh
22. Aniket Jadhav

Pool A

Pos	Team	Pld	W	D	L	GF	GA	GD	Pts	Qualification
1	China (H)	3	2	1	0	9	1	+8	7	Knockout stage
2	India	3	1	1	1	3	6	−3	4	Knockout stage
3	Myanmar	3	1	1	1	2	5	−3	4	Knockout stage
4	Bangladesh	3	0	1	2	0	2	−2	1	

Source: Football – Men – Groups
Rules for classification: Group stage tiebreakers
(H) Hosts

19 September 2023
19:30

China	5–1	India
Gao Tianyi 17'; Dai Wai Tsun 51'; Tao Qianglong 72', 75'; Fang Hao 90+2'	Report	Rahul K.P. 45'

Huanglong Sports Centre Stadium, Hangzhou
Attendance: 34,513
Referee: Thoriq Alkatiri (Indonesia)

21 September 2023
16:00

India	1–0	Bangladesh
Sunil Chhetri 85' (pen.)	Report

Xiaoshan Sports Centre Stadium, Hangzhou
Attendance: 5,232
Referee: Clifford Daypuyat (Philippines)

24 September 2023
19:30

Myanmar	1–1	India
Yan Kyaw Htwe 74'	Report	Sunil Chhetri 23' (pen.)

Xiaoshan Sports Centre Stadium, Hangzhou
Attendance: 6,315
Referee: Qasim Al-Hatmi (Oman)

Round of 16

28 September 2023
19:30 UTC+8

India	0–2	Saudi Arabia
	Report	Maran 52', 58'

Huanglong Sports Centre Stadium, Hangzhou
Attendance: 37,066
Referee: Shen Yinhao (China)

=== Women's tournament ===
Head Coach
(Sweden) Thomas Dennerby

Squad

1. Elangbam Panthoi Chanu
2. Soumya Narayanasamy
3. Shreya Hooda (Goalkeeper)
4. Loitongbam Ashalata Devi (Captain)
5. Ngangbam Sweety Devi
6. Sanju Yadav
7. Ritu Rani
8. Sorokhaibam Ranjana Chanu
9. Dalima Chhibber
10. Astam Oraon
11. Naorem Priyangka Devi
12. Anju Tamang
13. Indumathi Kathiresan
14. Sangita Basfore
15. Grace Dangmei
16. Soumya Guguloth
17. Manisha Kalyan
18. Renu
19. Sandhiya Ranganathan
20. Pyari Xaxa
21. Jyoti Chouhan
22. Bala Devi

Pool B

Pos	Team	Pld	W	D	L	GF	GA	GD	Pts	Qualification
1	Chinese Taipei	2	2	0	0	3	1	+2	6	Knockout stage
2	Thailand	2	1	0	1	1	1	0	3	Knockout stage
3	India	2	0	0	2	1	3	−2	0	

Source: Football – Women – Groups
Rules for classification: Group stage tiebreakers

21 September 2023
19:30 UTC+8

Chinese Taipei	2–1	India
Lai Li-chin 68'; Su Yu-hsuan 84'	Report	Tamang 46'

Wenzhou Olympic Sports Center Stadium, Wenzhou
Attendance: 5,681
Referee: Casey Reibelt (Australia)

24 September 2023
16:00 UTC+8

India	0–1	Thailand
	Report	Parichat 51'

Wenzhou Olympic Sports Center Stadium, Wenzhou
Attendance: 16,047
Referee: Le Thi Ly (Vietnam)

== Golf ==
The Indian Golf Union announced a seven member squad after trials.

=== Men ===
Athlete	Event	Round 1	Round 2	Round 3	Round 4	Total		
Athlete	Event	Score	Score	Score	Score	Score	To Par	Rank
Anirban Lahiri	Individual	65	67	74	68	274	−14	T12
Shubhankar Sharma	Individual	68	69	76	73	286	−2	32
Shiv Chawrasia	Individual	67	72	68	75	282	−6	29
Khalin Joshi	Individual	70	69	69	73	281	−7	T27
Anirban Lahiri; Shubhankar Sharma; Shiv Chawrasia; Khalin Joshi	Team	200	205	211	214	830	−34	7

=== Women ===
Athlete	Event	Round 1	Round 2	Round 3	Round 4	Total		
Athlete	Event	Score	Score	Score	Score	Score	To Par	Rank
Aditi Ashok	Individual	67	66	61	77	271	−17	2nd place, silver medalist(s)
Pranavi Urs	Individual	71	68	70	75	284	−4	13
Avani Prashanth	Individual	72	69	74	76	291	3	T18
Aditi Ashok; Pranavi Urs; Avani Prashanth	Team	138	134	131	151	554	−22	4

== Gymnastics ==
Pranati Nayak was the only gymnast selected for the games.

=== Artistic ===
Women
Qualification

Athlete	Event	Vault		Uneven bars		Balance beam		Floor		Final	
Athlete	Event	Score	Rank	Score	Rank	Score	Rank	Score	Rank	Score	Rank
Pranati Nayak	All-around	12.719	6 Q	10.300	24	11.233	28	9.833	35	44.232	23

Finals

Athlete	Event	Score	Rank
Pranati Nayak	Vault	12.350	8

== Handball ==
A 16-member squad was selected for the women's tournament.

Team	Event	Group stage					Semi-final	Final	
Team	Event	Opposition Score	Opposition Score	Opposition Score	Opposition Score	Rank	Opposition Score	Opposition Score	Rank
India women's	Women's tournament	Japan; L 13–41	Hong Kong; D 26–26	China; L 30–37	Nepal; W 44–19	3	Did not advance		

=== Women's tournament ===
Squad

1. Bhawana Sharma
2. Diksha Kumari
3. Menika Thakur
4. Priyanka Thakur
5. Sonika
6. Sushma
7. Pooja Kanwar
8. Asha Rani
9. Mitali Sharma
10. Nidhi Sharma
11. Nina Shil
12. Jyoti Shukla
13. Shivani Singh
14. Tejaswini Singh
15. Priyanka Thakur
16. Shalini Thakur

Group B

Pos	Team	Pld	W	D	L	GF	GA	GD	Pts	Qualification
1	Japan	4	4	0	0	167	58	+109	8	Semifinals
2	China	4	3	0	1	154	81	+73	6	Semifinals
3	India	4	1	1	2	113	123	−10	3 (Note: Head-to-head result: IND 26–26 HKG. Overall goal difference was used as the tiebreaker.)	
4	Hong Kong	4	1	1	2	78	117	−39	3	
5	Nepal	4	0	0	4	57	190	−133	0	

Source: AHF
Notes:

25 September; 14:00	India	13–41	Japan	ZJNU Xiaoshan Gymnasium, Hangzhou; Referees: Ismoilov, Ismoilov (UZB)
25 September; 14:00	M. Thakur 4	(4–21)	Ishikawa 7	ZJNU Xiaoshan Gymnasium, Hangzhou; Referees: Ismoilov, Ismoilov (UZB)
25 September; 14:00	3× (suspension)		1× (suspension)	ZJNU Xiaoshan Gymnasium, Hangzhou; Referees: Ismoilov, Ismoilov (UZB)

27 September; 19:00	India	26–26	Hong Kong	ZJNU Xiaoshan Gymnasium, Hangzhou; Referees: Shakir, Kadhim (IRQ)
27 September; 19:00	M. Thakur 8	(10–12)	Cheung M.N. 7	ZJNU Xiaoshan Gymnasium, Hangzhou; Referees: Shakir, Kadhim (IRQ)
27 September; 19:00	5× (suspension)		2× (suspension)	ZJNU Xiaoshan Gymnasium, Hangzhou; Referees: Shakir, Kadhim (IRQ)

29 September; 18:00	India	30–37	China	ZJNU Xiaoshan Gymnasium, Hangzhou; Referees: Tavakkoli, Valadkhanian (IRI)
29 September; 18:00	B. Sharma, M. Thakur 8	(12–18)	Tian 6	ZJNU Xiaoshan Gymnasium, Hangzhou; Referees: Tavakkoli, Valadkhanian (IRI)
29 September; 18:00	4× (suspension)		1× (suspension)	ZJNU Xiaoshan Gymnasium, Hangzhou; Referees: Tavakkoli, Valadkhanian (IRI)

30 September; 14:00	Nepal	19–44	India	ZJNU Xiaoshan Gymnasium, Hangzhou; Referees: Ghofli, Hassanzadeh (IRI)
30 September; 14:00	B. Rai 7	(8–21)	N. Sharma 11	ZJNU Xiaoshan Gymnasium, Hangzhou; Referees: Ghofli, Hassanzadeh (IRI)
30 September; 14:00	3× (suspension)		3× (suspension)	ZJNU Xiaoshan Gymnasium, Hangzhou; Referees: Ghofli, Hassanzadeh (IRI)

== Judo ==
Athlete	Event	Round of 16	Quarterfinal	Semi-final/Repechage	Final / BM	Rank
Athlete	Event	Opposition Result	Opposition Result	Opposition Result	Opposition Result	Rank
Avtar Singh	Men's-100 kg	Hantratin (THA); W 1–0	Kostoev (UAE); L 0–10	Won J-h (KOR); L 0–10	Did not advance	
Garima Chaudhary	Women's 70 kg	Salinas (PHI); L 0s1–10	Did not advance			
Indubala Maibam	Women's 78 kg	Oeda (THA); L 0s2–10s2	Did not advance			
Tulika Maan	Women's +78 kg	Lai Q L (MAC); W 10–0	Tomita (JPN); L 0–10	Tsai J W (TPE); W 10–0	Amarsaikhany (MGL); L 0s3–10s2	4

== Kabaddi ==
A 24-member squad was announced for Kabaddi events.

Team	Event	Group stage					Semi-final	Final	
Team	Event	Opposition Score	Opposition Score	Opposition Score	Opposition Score	Rank	Opposition Score	Opposition Score	Rank
India men	Men's tournament	Bangladesh; W 55–18	Thailand; W 63–26	Chinese Taipei; W 50–27	Japan; W 56–30	1 Q	Pakistan; W 61–14	Iran; W 33–29	1st place, gold medalist(s)
India women	Women's tournament	Chinese Taipei; D 34–34	South Korea; W 56–23	Thailand; W 54–22	—N/a	1 Q	Nepal; W 61–17	Chinese Taipei; W 26–25	1st place, gold medalist(s)

=== Men's tournament ===
Squad

1. Nitesh Kumar
2. Parvesh Bhainswal
3. Sachin Tanwar
4. Surjeet Singh Narwal
5. Vishal Bhardwaj
6. Arjun Deshwal
7. Aslam Inamdar
8. Naveen Kumar
9. Pawan Sehrawat
10. Sunil Kumar
11. Nitin Rawal
12. Akash Shinde

Group A

Pos	Team	Pld	W	D	L	PF	PA	PD	Pts	Qualification
1	India	4	4	0	0	224	101	+123	8	Semifinals
2	Chinese Taipei	4	3	0	1	141	114	+27	6	Semifinals
3	Bangladesh	4	2	0	2	133	132	+1	4	
4	Thailand	4	1	0	3	124	184	−60	2	
5	Japan	4	0	0	4	100	191	−91	0	

Source: Official website

3 October
8:30

India	55–18 (HT: 24–9)	Bangladesh

Xiaoshan Guali Sports Centre, Hangzhou

4 October
8:30

India	63–26 (HT: 37–9)	Thailand

Xiaoshan Guali Sports Centre, Hangzhou

5 October
10:35

India	50–27 (HT: 28–12)	Chinese Taipei

Xiaoshan Guali Sports Centre, Hangzhou

5 October
16:10

Japan	30–56 (HT: 11–35)	India

Xiaoshan Guali Sports Centre, Hangzhou

Semi–Final

6 October
15:00

India	61–14 (HT: 30–5)	Pakistan

Xiaoshan Guali Sports Centre, Hangzhou

Final

7 October
15:00

India	33–29 (HT: 17–13)	Iran

Xiaoshan Guali Sports Centre, Hangzhou

=== Women's tournament ===
Squad

1. Akshima Singh
2. Jyoti Thakur
3. Pooja Hathwala
4. Pooja Narwal
5. Priyanka Pilaniya
6. Pushpa Rana
7. Sakshi Kumari
8. Ritu Negi
9. Nidhi Sharma
10. Sushma Sharma
11. Snehal Shinde
12. Muskan Malik

Group A

Pos	Team	Pld	W	D	L	PF	PA	PD	Pts	Qualification
1	India	3	2	1	0	144	79	+65	5 (Note: Match points difference against the teams which scored 25% or more of the league points: IND +32, TPE +9.)	Semifinals
2	Chinese Taipei	3	2	1	0	106	86	+20	5	Semifinals
3	Thailand	3	1	0	2	93	114	−21	2	
4	South Korea	3	0	0	3	70	134	−64	0	

Source: Official website
Notes:

2 October
16:20

India	34–34 (HT: 17–15)	Chinese Taipei

Xiaoshan Guali Sports Centre, Hangzhou

3 October
16:10

South Korea	23–56 (HT: 9–32)	India

Xiaoshan Guali Sports Centre, Hangzhou

4 October
16:15

India	54–22 (HT: 32–9)	Thailand

Xiaoshan Guali Sports Centre, Hangzhou

Semi–Final

6 October
9:30

India	61–17 (HT: 29–10)	Nepal

Xiaoshan Guali Sports Centre, Hangzhou

Final

7 October
9:30

India	26–25 (HT: 14–9)	Chinese Taipei

Xiaoshan Guali Sports Centre, Hangzhou

== Martial arts ==
=== Ju-jitsu ===
Men

Athlete	Event	Round of 32	Round of 16	Quarterfinal	Semi-final	Final	Rank
Athlete	Event	Opposition Result	Opposition Result	Opposition Result	Opposition Result	Opposition Result	Rank
Kamal Singh	62 kg	Rahmanov (TKM); L 0–2	Did not advance				
Tarun Yadav	62 kg	Cản V T (VIE); L 0–7	Did not advance				
Amarjit Singh Lohan	85 kg	Bayarkhuu (MGL); L 0–0	Did not advance				
Uma Maheshwar	85 kg	Suntra (THA); L 0–50	Did not advance				

Women

Athlete	Event	Round of 32	Round of 16	Quarterfinal	Semi-final	Final	Rank
Athlete	Event	Opposition Result	Opposition Result	Opposition Result	Opposition Result	Opposition Result	Rank
Navya Pandey	48 kg	Batbayar (MGL); L 0–11	Did not advance				
Anwesha Deb	48 kg	Bye	Wu Gs (CHN); L 0–50	Did not advance			
Rohini Kalam	52 kg	Bye	Al-Hosani (UAE); L 0–50	Did not advance			
Anupama Swain	52 kg	Bye	Miao J (CHN); L 0–12	Did not advance			
Angitha Shyju	57 kg	Geum G-e (KOR); L 0–50	Did not advance				
Nikita Chaudhary	57 kg	Bye	Udval (MGL); L 0–50	Did not advance			
Kiran Kumari	63 kg	—N/a	Bayarmaa (MGL); L 0–50	Did not advance			

=== Kurash ===
Athlete	Event	Round of 32	Round of 16	Quarterfinal	Semi-final	Final	Rank
Athlete	Event	Opposition Result	Opposition Result	Opposition Result	Opposition Result	Opposition Result	Rank
Keshav	Men's 66 kg	—N/a	Kwon J-d (KOR); L 0–10	Did not advance			
Aditya Dhopaokar	Men's 81 kg	—N/a	Rasooli (AFG); L 0–10	Did not advance			
Yash Chauhan	Men's 90 kg	—N/a	Bye	Azarang (IRN); L 0–10	Did not advance		
Pincky Balhara	Women's 52 kg	Haydarova (TKM); W 5–0	Lee Y-j (KOR); W 5–3	Elmurodova (UZB); L 0–0	Did not advance		
Suchika Tariyal	Women's 52 kg	Quelino (PHI); L 3–8	Did not advance				
Jyoti Tokas	Women's 87 kg	—N/a	Bye	Omid (IRN); L 0–3	Did not advance		

=== Taekwondo ===
Kyorugi

Athlete	Event	Round of 32	Round of 16	Quarter-final	Semi-final	Final	
Athlete	Event	Opposition Score	Opposition Score	Opposition Score	Opposition Score	Opposition Score	Rank
Shivansh Tyagi	Men's 80 kg	Mithona (CAM); W 2–0	Park W-h (KOR); L 0–2	Did not advance			
Margarette Maria Regi	Women's 67 kg	—N/a	Chang J-e (TPE); L 0–2	Did not advance			

=== Wushu ===
Sanda

Athlete	Event	1/8 finals	Quarter-final	Semi-final	Final	
Athlete	Event	Opposition Score	Opposition Score	Opposition Score	Opposition Score	Rank
Sunil Singh Mayanglambam	Men's 56 kg	Mandal (PHI); L WPD	Did not advance			
Surya Bhanu Pratap Singh	Men's 60 kg	Khaydarov (UZB); W 2–1	Kim M-s (KOR); L 1–2	Did not advance		
Vikrant Baliyan	Men's 65 kg	Marbun (INA); L 1–2	Did not advance			
Suraj Yadav	Men's 70 kg	Bye	Hotak (AFG); L 2–3	Did not advance		
Naorem Roshibina Devi	Women's 60 kg	—N/a	Karshyga (KAZ); W WPD	Nguyen T T T (VIE); W 2–0	Wu Xw (CHN); L 0–2	2nd place, silver medalist(s)

Taolu

Athlete	Event	Total	
Athlete	Event	Score	Rank
Anjul Namdeo	Men's Changquan	9.710	6
Suraj Singh Mayanglambam	Men's Changquan	9.730	5
Rohit Jadhav	Men's Daoshu & Gunshu	18.966	9

== Mind sports ==
=== Bridge ===
The Bridge Federation of India announced its team for the upcoming Asian Games in Hangzhou on 20 March 2023.

Team

Athlete	Event	Qualification Round				Semi-finals	Finals	Rank
Athlete	Event	Round Robin 1	Round Robin 2	Points	Rank	Semi-finals	Finals	Rank
Jaggy Shivdasani; Sandeep Thakral; Rajeshwar Tiwari; Sumit Mukherjee; Raju Tolani; Ajay Khare	Men	Philippines (PHI) W 18.04–1.96 Singapore (SGP) W 10.97–9.03; Bangladesh (BAN) W 10.66–9.34; No Competitor W 12–0; South Korea (KOR) W 16.03–3.97; Japan (JPN) L 9.03–10.97; China (CHN) L 9.67–10.33; Thailand (THA) W 18.17–1.83; Pakistan (PAK) W 20–0; Chinese Taipei (TPE) W 15.26–4.74; Hong Kong (HKG) W 15.26–4.74	Philippines (PHI) W 18.65–1.35 Pakistan (PAK) W 17.91–2.09; Bangladesh (BAN) L 6.77–13.23; Thailand (THA) L 7.56–12.44; South Korea (KOR) W 19.47–0.53; No Competitor W 12–0; Hong Kong (HKG) L 3.62–16.38; China (CHN) W 11.28–8.72; Singapore (SIN) W 14.19–5.81; Chinese Taipei (TPE) W 12.16–7.84; Japan (JPN) L 9.67–10.33	288.60	2 Q	China (CHN); W 180.6–170 (W 62–22; D 22–22; L 17–31; L 16–36; W 37–24; L 25–35)	Hong Kong (HKG); L 152–229.1 (L 32–55; L 29–46; W 30–28; L 32–42; L 17–38; L 12–17)	2nd place, silver medalist(s)
Asha Sharma; Puja Batra; Alka Kshirsagar; Bharti Dey; Kalpana Gurjar; Vidya Patel	Women	Thailand (THA) L 7.84–12.16 South Korea (KOR) W 11.87–8.13; Chinese Taipei (TPE) L 0–20; Indonesia (INA) W 11.28–8.72; China (CHN) L 6.77–13.23; Hong Kong (HKG) L 4.74–15.26; Singapore (SIN) W 10.33–9.67	Hong Kong (HKG) L 3.45–16.55 China (CHN) L 1.24–18.76; Indonesia (INA) W 11.58–8.42; Chinese Taipei (TPE) W 16.21–3.79; Thailand (THA) W 13.96–6.04; Singapore (SIN) L 7.56–12.44; South Korea (KOR) W 18.65–1.35	125.48	7	Did not advance		
Kiran Nadar; B Satyanarayana; Himani Khandelwal; Rajeev Khandelwal; Marianne Karmarkar; Sandeep Karmarkar	Mixed	No competitor W 12–0 Hong Kong (HKG) L 3.28–16.72; South Korea (KOR) W 17.19–2.81; Philippines (PHI) L 7.56–12.44; Indonesia (INA) W 14.85–5.15; Chinese Taipei (TPE) D 10–10; Japan (JPN) L 5.36–14.64; China (CHN) W 16.55–3.45; Pakistan (PAK) W 10.66–9.34; Thailand (THA) W 16.72–3.28; Singapore (SIN) W 14.64–5.36	Japan (JPN) L 3.97–16.03 No Competitor W 12–0; Pakistan (PAK) W 14.19–5.81; South Korea (KOR) W 19.65–0.35; Philippines (PHI) W 15.06–4.94; Indonesia (INA) L 4.15–15.85; Chinese Taipei (TPE) L 4.34–15.66; Hong Kong (HKG) L 3.97–16.03; Thailand (THA) W 17.77–2.23; China (CHN) W 11.58–8.42; Singapore (SIN) L 3.97–16.03	233.28	5	Did not advance		

=== Chess ===
Individual rapid

Athlete	Event	Round 1	Round 2	Round 3	Round 4	Round 5	Round 6	Round 7	Round 8	Round 9	Final Score	Rank
Arjun Erigaisi	Men	Bersamina (PHI); W 1–0	Le TM (VIE); D 0.5–0.5	Nguyễn (VIE); W 1–0	Tabatabaei (IRI); D 0.5–0.5	Sindarov (UZB); D 0.5–0.5	Bilguun (MGL); L 0–1	Priasmoro (INA); W 1–0	Abdusattorov (UZB); L 0–1	Hossain (BAN); W 1–0	5.5	6
Vidit Gujrathi	Men	Mohammad (BAN); W 1–0	Nogerbek (KAZ); L 0–1	Laohawirapap (THA); W 1–0	Le TM (VIE); W 1–0	Maghsoodloo (IRI); W 1–0	Abdusattorov (UZB); W 1–0	Wei Yi (CHN); L 0–1	Bilguun (MGL); D 0.5–0.05	Sindarov (UZB); L 0–1	5.5	5
Koneru Humpy	Women	Alinasab (IRI); W 1–0	Pham LTN (VIE); W 1–0	Zhu (CHN); D 0.5–0.5	Yifan (CHN); L 0–1	Yakubbaeva (UZB); W 1–0	Aulia (INA); D 0.5–0.5	Abdumalik (KAZ); D 0.5–0.5	Dronavalli (IND); D 0.5–0.5	Assaubayeva (KAZ); D 0.5–0.5	5.5	7
Harika Dronavalli	Women	Alali (UAE); W 1–0	Gong (SIN); W 1–0	Yifan (CHN); L 0–1	Yakubbaeva (UZB); D 0.5–0.5	Võ Thị (VIE); W 1–0	Abdumalik (KAZ); D 0.5–0.5	Turmunh (MGL); D 0.5–0.5	Humpy (IND); D 0.5–0.5	Zhu (CHN); W 1–0	6	4

Team standard

Athlete	Event	Round 1	Round 2	Round 3	Round 4	Round 5	Round 6	Round 7	Round 8	Round 9	Final Score	Rank
Gukesh D R Praggnanandhaa; Vidit Gujrathi; Arjun Erigaisi; Pentala Harikrishna	Men	Mongolia (MGL); W 3.5–0.5	Uzbekistan (UZB); D 2–2	Kazakhstan (KAZ); W 3–1	Kyrgyzstan (KGZ); W 3.5–0.5	Iran (IRI); D 2–2	China (CHN); D 2–2	Vietnam (VIE); W 2.5–1.5	South Korea (KOR); W 3.5–0.5	Philippines (PHI); W 3.5–0.5	15	2nd place, silver medalist(s)
Koneru Humpy; Harika Dronavalli; R Vaishali; Vantika Agrawal; Savitha Shri B	Women	Philippines (PHI); W 3.5–0.5	Vietnam (VIE); W 2.5–1.5	Indonesia (INA); W 3.5–0.5	China (CHN); L 1.5–2.5	Mongolia (MGL); W 4–0	Uzbekistan (UZB); W 4–0	Kazakhstan (KAZ); D 2–2	Hong Kong (HKG); W 4–0	South Korea (KOR); W 4–0	15	2nd place, silver medalist(s)

=== Esports ===
After qualification tournaments held by the Esports Federation of India, India will send athletes in FIFA Online 4, Street Fighter V, Hearthstone, League of Legends. Later Hearthstone was removed from the official program.

Athletes	Event	Round 1	Round 2	Quarter final	Semi-final	Final	Rank
Charanjot Singh	FIFA Online	Liu Jiacheng (CHN); L 0–2 Jorrel Aristorenas (PHI); W 2–0; Rashid Khaled (BRN); W 2–1; Olzhas Yessentayev (KAZ); W 2–0; Liu Jiacheng (CHN); L 0–2	Did not advance				
Karmaan Singh	FIFA Online	Faqeehi Abdullaziz (BHR); L 1–2 Abdelrehman Kiswani (PLE); W 2–1; Meshari Aldhafiri (KUW); L 1–2	Did not advance				
Mayank Prajapati	Street Fighter V	Rajikhan Talal (KSA); L 1–2 Abdulla Al-Mannai (QAT); L 0–2	Did not advance				
Ayan Bishwas	Street Fighter V	Khanh Hung Chao Nguyen (VIE); W 2–0 Abdulrahman Salem Alrayfal (KSA); L 1–2; Khanh Hung Chao Nguyen (VIE); W 2–0; Man Ho Yeh (HKG); L 0–2	Did not advance				
Akshaj Shenoy (C); Samarth Trivedi; Mihir Ranjan; Aditya Selvaraj; Aakash Shandilya; Sanindhya Malik	League of Legends	—N/a	Bye	Vietnam (VIE); L 0–2	Did not advance		
Darshan Bata (C); Krish Gupta; Abhishek Yadav; Ketan Goyal; Shubham Goli	Dota 2	—N/a	Kyrgyzstan (KGZ); L 0–1 Philippines (PHI); L 0–1	Did not advance			

== Modern pentathlon ==
Athlete	Event	Ranking Round		Semi-final									Final							
Athlete	Event	Fencing (épée one touch)					Swimming		Laser Run		Total points	Rank	Riding		Swimming		Laser Run		Total	Rank
Athlete	Event	MP Points (RR)	Rank	MP Points (BR)	Total (RR+BR)	Rank	MP Points	Rank	MP Points	Rank	Total points	Rank	MP	Rank	MP	Rank	MP	Rank	Total	Rank
Mayank Chaphekar	Men's individual	166	28	2	168	13	295	6	542	13	1005	13	Did not advance						1005	27

== Roller sports ==
=== Artistic ===
Athlete	Event	Short Final	Rank	Long Final	Rank	Points	Final Rank
Sai Samhitha Akula	Women's free skating	16.95	6	32.69	4	49.64	5
Greeshma Dontara	Women's free skating	20.94	4	28.7	6	49.64	6

=== Inline freestyle ===
Athlete	Event	Preliminary				Round of 16	Quarter final	Semi-final	Final	
Athlete	Event	Time			Rank	Opposition Score	Opposition Score	Opposition Score	Opposition Score	Rank
Athlete	Event	Run 1	Run 2	Best	Rank	Opposition Score	Opposition Score	Opposition Score	Opposition Score	Rank
Vishvesh Patil	Men's speed slalom	4.983	DQ	4.983	16 Q	Pin-Ruei (TPE); L 0–2	Did not advance			
Jinesh Nanal	Men's speed slalom	4.666	4.692	4.666	13 Q	Zhang (CHN); L 0–2	Did not advance			
Merlin Dhanam	Women's speed slalom	5.155	5.127	5.127	12	—N/a	Did not advance			
Shreyashi Joshi	Women's speed slalom	6.405	5.538	5.538	13	—N/a	Did not advance			
Jinesh Nanal; Shreyashi Joshi	Mixed slalom pair	—N/a								7

=== Speed skating ===
Men

Athlete	Event	Heats		Semi-finals		Finals		
Athlete	Event	Time	Rank	Time	Rank	Time	Points	Rank
Vikram Ingale	1000 m sprint	1:32.598	3 q	1:26.100	6 q	1:29.952	—N/a	4
Aryanpal Singh	1000 m sprint	1:42.708	11 q	1:26.222	7 q	1:30.466	—N/a	7
Anandkumar Velkumar	10000 m points elimination	—N/a				15:40.978	4	6
Siddhant Kamble	10000 m points elimination	—N/a				15:57.944	4	7
Vikram Ingale; Siddhant Kamble; Aryanpal Singh; Anandkumar Velkumar	3000 m relay	—N/a				4:10.128	—N/a	3rd place, bronze medalist(s)

Women

Athlete	Event	Heats		Semi-finals		Finals		
Athlete	Event	Time	Rank	Time	Rank	Time	Points	Rank
Karthika Jagadeeshwaran	1000 m sprint	1:44.957	9 q	1:36.860	4 q	1:40.395	—N/a	5
Sanjana Bathula	1000 m sprint	1:45.435	11 q	1:42.681	11	Did not advance		
Aarthy Kasturi	10000 m points elimination	—N/a				17:41.159	3	5
Heeral Sadhu	10000 m points elimination	—N/a				NA	—N/a	7
Aarthy Kasturi; Heeral Sadhu; Karthika Jagadeeshwaran; Sanjana Bathula	3000 m relay	—N/a				4:34.861	—N/a	3rd place, bronze medalist(s)

== Rowing ==
The Rowing Federation of India announced a 33-member squad for the Asian Games.

=== Men ===
Athlete	Event	Heat		Repechage/ Semi-final		Final	
Athlete	Event	Time	Rank	Time	Rank	Time	Rank
Balraj Panwar	Single sculls	7:11.01	3 SA/B	7:22.22	3 FA	7:08:79	4
Satnam Singh; Parminder Singh	Double sculls	6:27.01	2 R	6:48.06	1 FA	6:40.90	6
Satnam Singh; Parminder Singh; Jakar Khan; Sukhmeet Singh	Quadruple sculls	6:16.65	2 R	6:09.94	1 FA	6:08.61	3rd place, bronze medalist(s)
Arvind Singh; Arjun Lal Jat	Lightweight double sculls	6:27.45	2 R	6:55.78	1 FA	6:28.18	2nd place, silver medalist(s)
Babu Lal Yadav; Lekh Ram	Coxless pair	6:42.59	3 FA	—N/a		6:50.41	3rd place, bronze medalist(s)
Jaswinder Singh; Bheem Singh; Punit Kumar; Ashish	Coxless four	6:20.47	1 FA	—N/a		6:10.81	3rd place, bronze medalist(s)
Jaswinder Singh; Bheem Singh; Punit Kumar; Ashish Godara; Neeraj Maan; Naresh Kalwaniya; Neetish Kumar; Charanjeet Singh; Dhananjay Pande	Eight	5:38.65	2 FA	—N/a		5:43.01	2nd place, silver medalist(s)

=== Women ===
Athlete	Event	Heat		Repechage/ Semi-final		Final	
Athlete	Event	Time	Rank	Time	Rank	Time	Rank
Kiran; Anshika Bharti	Lightweight double scull	7:27.57	4 R	8:01.80	4 FB	7:40.84	9
Aswathi P. B. Mrunamayee N Salgaonkar; Thangjam Priya Devi; Rukmani	Coxless four	7:09.07	6 FA	—N/a		7:12.40	5
Aswathi P. B. Mrunamayee N Salgaonkar; Thangjam Priya Devi; Rukmani; Sonali Swain; Ritu Kaudi; Varsha K. B. H. Tendenthoi Devi; G. Geetanjali	Eight	6:41.37	4 FA	—N/a		7:05.71	5

Reserves

- Rukmani
- Archa Aji

== Rugby 7s ==
A 12-member squad was announced for the women's tournament on 13 September 2023.

Team	Event	Group stage				Semi-final / Pl.	Final GM / BM / Pl.	
Team	Event	Opposition score	Opposition score	Opposition score	Rank	Opposition score	Opposition score	Rank
India women's	Women's tournament	Hong Kong; L 0–38	Japan; L 0–45	Singapore; L 0–15	4	Kazakhstan; L 7–24	Did not advance	7

=== Women's tournament ===
Coach
(South Africa) Ludwiche Van Deventer
Squad

1. Priya Bansal
2. Hupi Majhi
3. Dumuni Marandi
4. Mama Naik
5. Tarulata Naik
6. Lachmi Oraon
7. Kalyani Patil
8. Vaishnavi Patil
9. Sandhya Rai
10. Sweta Shahi
11. Sheetal Sharma (Captain)
12. Shikha Yadav

Group B

Pos	Team	Pld	W	D	L	PF	PA	PD	Pts	Qualification
1	Japan	3	3	0	0	124	5	+119	9	Semifinals
2	Hong Kong	3	2	0	1	72	22	+50	7	Semifinals
3	Singapore	3	1	0	2	15	86	−71	5	Placing 5–7
4	India	3	0	0	3	0	98	−98	3	Placing 5–7

Source: OCA

24 September
12:30

Hong Kong	38–0	India
Try: Chong (3) 3' c, 4' m, 10' c Li 6' c Olson-Thorne 8' m Ho T. 14+'c Con: J. Ho (3/5); S. Chan (1/1)

Cangqian Athletics Field, Hangzhou
Referee: Eri Kamimura (Japan)

24 September
18:05

Japan	45–0	India
Try: Nakamura (2) 1' m, 5' m Otake 3' c Tsujisaki 6' c Hara 9' c Suda 10' c Otani 13' c Con: Tanaka (3/5); Suda (2/2)

Cangqian Athletics Field, Hangzhou
Referee: Noor Jefri Mustafa (Malaysia)

25 September
10:50

India	0–15	Singapore
		Try: Chew 7+' m Ong 14' m Tan 14+' m Con: Yuen (0/3)

Cangqian Athletics Field, Hangzhou
Referee: Ano Kuwai (Japan)

Semi-finals 5th–7th

25 September
16:00

Kazakhstan	24–7	India
Try: Stepanyuga 2' c Kim 5' m Pichugina 11' c Tulegenova 13' m Con: Koishybayeva (1/2); Abisheva (1/2)		Try: T. Naik 6' c Con: T. Naik (1/1)

Cangqian Athletics Field, Hangzhou
Referee: Eri Kamimura (Japan)

== Sailing ==
=== Men ===
Athlete	Event	Race																			Total Points	Net Points	Final Rank
Athlete	Event	1	2	3	4	5	6	7	8	9	10	11	12	13	14	15	16	17	18	MR	Total Points	Net Points	Final Rank
Eabad Ali	RS:X	3	7 DNF	7 DNF	3	3	2	4	4	6	4	7 DNF	3	4	2	—N/a					59	52	3rd place, bronze medalist(s)
Chitresh Tatha	Kite	6	7	7	7	5	5	6	5	7	5	6	7	7	7	6	5	—N/a		CAN	98	77	7
Adhvait Menon	ILCA4	5	6	3	13; DSQ	8	10	10	13; DSQ	5	3	13; RET	—N/a								89	76	8
Vishnu Saravanan	ILCA7	1	5	1	7	5	2	5	14; RET	5	2	1	—N/a							CAN	48	34	3rd place, bronze medalist(s)
Jerome Kumar	IQFoil	8	5	6	8	7	7	5	7	7	8	3	7	10; DNS	10; DNF	7	6	7	6	CAN	124	96	7
K. C. Ganapathy; Varun Thakkar	49er	8	3	4	3	3	3	1	6	1	2	8	7	2	5	—N/a					56	48	5

=== Women ===
Athlete	Event	Race															Total Points	Net Points	Final Rank
Athlete	Event	1	2	3	4	5	6	7	8	9	10	11	12	13	14	MR	Total Points	Net Points	Final Rank
Ishwariya Ganesh	RS:X	3	3	5 DNF	4	5 DNF	3	4	4	4	4	4	3	4	3	—N/a	53	48	4
Neha Thakur	ILKA4	3	3	3	1	5	3	3	2	3	2	4	—N/a				32	27	2nd place, silver medalist(s)
Nethra Kumanan	ILKA6	2	4	6	7	2	7	3	7	5	1	4	—N/a			CAN	48	41	4
Harshita Tomar; Shital Verma	49er FX	6	2	3	4	2	3	1	5	4	2	5	6	6	4	—N/a	53	47	4

=== Mixed ===
Athlete	Event	Race														Total Points	Net Points	Final Rank
Athlete	Event	1	2	3	4	5	6	7	8	9	10	11	12	13	14	Total Points	Net Points	Final Rank
Preethi Kongara; Sudhanshu Shekhar	470	4	4	5	6	4	4	4	6	3	5	6	6	—N/a		57	51	6
Siddheshwar Doiphode; Ramya Sarvanan	Nacra 17	3	2	3	4	6 DSQ	4	4	2	4	3	3	4	5	4	51	45	4

== Sepak takraw ==
Men

Athlete	Event	Group stage					Semi-final	Final	
Athlete	Event	Opposition Score	Opposition Score	Opposition Score	Opposition Score	Rank	Opposition Score	Opposition Score	Rank
Arun; Niken Singh Khangembam; John Meitei Laishram; Henary Singh Wahengbam; Akash Yumnam	Regu	Thailand (THA); L 0–2	Philippines (PHI); L 0–2	Myanmar (MYA); L 0–2	—N/a	4	Did not advance		
Niken Singh Khangembam; Akash Yumnam; Malemnganba Singh Sorokhaibam; Sandeep Kumar; Arun; Shiva Kumar Chakali	Quadrant	Japan (JPN); L 0–2	Singapore (SGP); W 2–0	Philippines (PHI); W 2–0	South Korea (KOR); L 1–2	4	Did not advance		

Women

Athlete	Event	Group stage				Semi-final	Final	
Athlete	Event	Opposition Score	Opposition Score	Opposition Score	Rank	Opposition Score	Opposition Score	Rank
Priya Devi Elangbam; Chaoba Devi Oinam; Maipak Devi Ayekpam; Khusbu; Leirentonbi Devi Elangbam	Regu	Vietnam (VIE); L 0–2	China (CHN); W 2–1	—N/a	2 Q	Thailand (THA); L 0–2	Did not advance	3rd place, bronze medalist(s)
Priya Devi Ayekpam; Sezovelu Dozo; Chaoba Devi Oinam; Maipak Devi Ayekpam; Tepa No Leirenton; Leirentonbi Devi Elangbam	Quadrant	Laos (LAO); L 0–2	China (CHN); L 0–2	Philippines (PHI); L 0–2	4	Did not advance		

== Shooting ==
A 21-member squad was announced by the National Rifle Association of India on 27 July 2023 after the selection trials were held at the Dr. Karni Singh Shooting Range. Three more names were added in September 2023.

Men
Individual

Athlete	Event	Qualification		Final	
Athlete	Event	Score	Rank	Score	Rank
Divyansh Singh Panwar	10 m air rifle	629.6	8	Did not advance (Note: Only top 2 players from each country can advance to the final)	
Rudrankksh Patil	10 m air rifle	632.5	3 Q	208.7	4
Aishwary Pratap Singh Tomar	10 m air rifle	631.6	5 Q	228.8	3rd place, bronze medalist(s)
Aishwary Pratap Singh Tomar	50 m rifle three positions	591 AR/GR	2 Q	459.7	2nd place, silver medalist(s)
Akhil Sheoran	50 m rifle three positions	587	5	Did not advance	
Swapnil Kusale	50 m rifle three positions	591 AR/GR	1 Q	438.9	4
Sarabjot Singh	10 m air pistol	580	5 Q	199	4
Shiva Narwal	10 m air pistol	576	14	Did not advance	
Arjun Singh Cheema	10 m air pistol	578	8 Q	113.3	8
Anish Bhanwala	25 m rapid fire pistol	560	21	Did not advance	
Vijayveer Singh	25 m rapid fire pistol	582	6 Q	21	4
Adarsh Singh	25 m rapid fire pistol	576	14	Did not advance	
Prithviraj Tondaiman	Trap	119	11	Did not advance	
Zoravar Singh Sandhu	Trap	120	2 Q	23	5
Kynan Chenai	Trap	122	1 Q	32	3rd place, bronze medalist(s)
Anantjeet Singh Naruka	Skeet	121	4 Q	58	2nd place, silver medalist(s)
Angad Vir Singh Bajwa	Skeet	117	17	Did not advance	
Gurjoat Siingh Khangura	Skeet	117	6	Did not advance	

Team

Athlete	Event	Final	
Athlete	Event	Score	Rank
Divyansh Singh Panwar; Rudrankksh Patil; Aishwary Pratap Singh Tomar	10 m air rifle	1893.7; WR	1st place, gold medalist(s)
Aishwary Pratap Singh Tomar; Akhil Sheoran; Swapnil Kusale	50 m rifle three positions	1769; WR	1st place, gold medalist(s)
Arjun Singh Cheema; Shiva Narwal; Sarabjot Singh	10 m air pistol	1734	1st place, gold medalist(s)
Adarsh Singh; Vijayveer Singh; Anish Bhanwala	25 m rapid fire pistol	1718	3rd place, bronze medalist(s)
Kynan Chenai; Prithviraj Tondaiman; Zoravar Singh Sandhu	Trap	361; GR	1st place, gold medalist(s)
Gurjoat Siingh Khangura; Anantjeet Singh Naruka; Angad Vir Singh Bajwa	Skeet	355	3rd place, bronze medalist(s)

Women
Individual

Athlete	Event	Qualification		Final	
Athlete	Event	Score	Rank	Score	Rank
Mehuli Ghosh	10 m air rifle	630.8	5 Q	208.3	4
Ramita Jindal	10 m air rifle	631.9	2 Q	230.1	3rd place, bronze medalist(s)
Ashi Chouksey	10 m air rifle	623.3	28	Did not advance	
Sift Kaur Samra	50 m rifle three positions	594	2 Q	469.6 WR	1st place, gold medalist(s)
Ashi Chouksey	50 m rifle three positions	590	6 Q	451.9	3rd place, bronze medalist(s)
Manini Kaushik	50 m rifle three positions	580	18	Did not advance	
Divya T. S.	10 m air pistol	575	10	Did not advance	
Palak Gulia	10 m air pistol	577	7 Q	242.1 GR	1st place, gold medalist(s)
Esha Singh	10 m air pistol	579	5 Q	239.7	2nd place, silver medalist(s)
Esha Singh	25 m pistol	586	5 Q	34	2nd place, silver medalist(s)
Rhythm Sangwan	25 m pistol	583	7	Did not advance	
Manu Bhaker	25 m pistol	590	1 Q	21	5
Manisha Keer	Trap	114	7 Q (Note: Only top 6 qualify; As threeting athletes in China were placed in top 6, seventh qualified)	16	6
Preeti Rajak	Trap	112	9	Did not advance	
Rajeshwari Kumari	Trap	111	11	Did not advance	
Ganemat Sekhon	Skeet	109	17	Did not advance	
Parinaaz Dhaliwal	Skeet	113	11	Did not advance	
Darshna Rathore	Skeet	114	8	Did not advance	

Team

Athlete	Event	Final	
Athlete	Event	Score	Rank
Mehuli Ghosh; Ramita Jindal; Ashi Chouksey	10 m air rifle	1886.0	2nd place, silver medalist(s)
Sift Kaur Samra; Manini Kaushik; Ashi Chouksey	50 m rifle three positions	1764	2nd place, silver medalist(s)
Palak Gulia; Divya T. S. Esha Singh	10 m air pistol	1731	2nd place, silver medalist(s)
Esha Singh; Manu Bhaker; Rhythm Sangwan	25 m air pistol	1759	1st place, gold medalist(s)
Manisha Keer; Preeti Rajak; Rajeshwari Kumari	Trap	337	2nd place, silver medalist(s)
Darshna Rathore; Ganemat Sekhon; Parinaaz Dhaliwal	Skeet	336	4

Mixed

Athlete	Event	Qualification		Final	
Athlete	Event	Score	Rank	Score	Rank
Divyansh Singh Panwar; Ramita Jindal	10 m air rifle	628.2	6 QB	18–20 L	4
Sarabjot Singh; Divya T. S.	10 m air pistol	577 GR	1 Q	14–16 L	2nd place, silver medalist(s)
Anantjeet Singh Naruka; Ganemat Sekhon	Skeet	138	7	Did not advance	

== Sport climbing ==
Speed

Athlete	Event	Qualification		Round of 16	Quarter-finals	Semi-finals	Final	
Athlete	Event	Time	Rank	Opposition Time	Opposition Time	Opposition Time	Opposition Time	Rank
Aman Verma	Men's individual	6.205	16 Q	Leonardo (INA); L −0.168	Did not advance			
Dhiraj Birajdar	Men's individual	7.313	20	Did not advance				
Anisha Verma	Women's individual	9.495	13 Q	Niu D (CHN); L −6.014	Did not advance			
Shivpreet Pannu	Women's individual	9.956	14 Q	Sallsabillah (INA); L −2.926	Did not advance			
Shivani Charak; Shivpreet Pannu; Anisha Verma	Women's relay	39.598	6	—N/a		Did not advance		

Lead and bouldering

Athlete	Event	Bouldering Qualification		Lead Qualification			Bouldering Semi-finals		Lead Semi-finals			Bouldering Final		Lead Final			Rank
Athlete	Event	Points	Rank	Hold Reached	Points	Rank	Points	Rank	Hold Reached	Points	Rank	Points	Rank	Hold Reached	Points	Rank	Rank
Bharath Kamath	Men	69.7	9	25+	28.1	15 Q	43.9	8	19	16	T15	Did not advance					
Aman Verma	Men	64.8	13	34	54	7 Q	23.9	13	28	36	7	Did not advance					
Shivani Charak	Women	39.8	18	10+	6.1	T18 Q	12.13	16	16+	8.1	15	Did not advance					
Saniya Shaikh	Women	44.3	17	11+	7.1	T11 Q	12.26	15	17	9	14	Did not advance					

== Squash ==
The Squash Racquets Federation of India announced a team of 8 members for the games.

=== Singles ===
Athlete	Event	Round of 32	Round of 16	Quarterfinals	Semi-finals	Final	Rank
Athlete	Event	Opposition Score	Opposition Score	Opposition Score	Opposition Score	Opposition Score	Rank
Saurav Ghosal	Men	Bye	Al-Tamimi (KUW); W 3–0	Tsukue (JPN); W 3–0	Leung (HKG); W 3–0	Ng E Y (MAS); L 1–3	2nd place, silver medalist(s)
Mahesh Mangaonkar	Men	Reyes (PHI); W 3–0	Tsukue (JPN); L 0–3	Did not advance			
Joshna Chinappa	Women	Bye	Heo M-y (KOR); L 1–3	Did not advance			
Tanvi Khanna	Women	Bye	Chujit (THA); W 3–0	Watanabe (JPN); L 0–3	Did not advance		

=== Doubles ===
Athlete	Event	Group stage					Quarterfinals	Semi-finals	Final	Rank
Athlete	Event	Opposition Score	Opposition Score	Opposition Score	Opposition Score	Rank	Opposition Score	Opposition Score	Opposition Score	Rank
Harinder Pal Sandhu; Dipika Pallikal	Mixed	Yoo J-j / Eum H-y (KOR); W 2–0	Zaman / Ali (PAK); W 2–0	Endo / Sugimoto (JPN); W 2–0	—N/a	1 Q	Garcia / Aribado (PHI); W 2–1	Wong C H / Lee K Y (HKG); W 2–1	Kamal / Azman (MAS); W 2–0	1st place, gold medalist(s)
Abhay Singh; Anahat Singh	Mixed	Pelino / Dalida (PHI); W 2–0	Zaman / Gul (PAK); W 2–0	Arkarahirunya / Prasertratanakul (THA); W 2–0	Tang M H / Tong T W (HKG); W 2–0	1 Q	Yang Y-s / Lee D-j (KOR); W 2–1	Kamal / Azman (MAS); L 1–2	Did not advance	3rd place, bronze medalist(s)

=== Team ===
Athlete	Event	Group stage						Semi-finals	Final	Rank
Athlete	Event	Opposition Score	Opposition Score	Opposition Score	Opposition Score	Opposition Score	Rank	Opposition Score	Opposition Score	Rank
Saurav Ghosal; Abhay Singh; Mahesh Mangaonkar; Harinder Pal Sandhu	Men	Singapore (SGP); W 3–0	Qatar (QAT); W 3–0	Kuwait (KUW); W 3–0	Pakistan (PAK); L 1–2	Nepal (NEP); W 3–0	2 Q	Malaysia (MAS); W 2–0	Pakistan (PAK); W 2–1	1st place, gold medalist(s)
Joshna Chinappa; Dipika Pallikal; Anahat Singh; Tanvi Khanna	Women	Pakistan (PAK); W 3–0	Nepal (NEP); W 3–0	Macau (MAC); W 3–0	Malaysia (MAS); L 0–3	—N/a	2 Q	Hong Kong (HKG); L 1–2	Did not advance	3rd place, bronze medalist(s)

== Table tennis ==
The Table Tennis Federation of India announced a 10-member squad for the Asian Games.

=== Singles ===
Athlete	Event	Round of 64	Round of 32	Round of 16	Quarterfinal	Semi-final	Final	
Athlete	Event	Opposition Score	Opposition Score	Opposition Score	Opposition Score	Opposition Score	Opposition Score	Rank
Sharath Kamal	Men	Bye	Ismail (MDV); W 4–0	Chuang C-y (TPE); L 3–4	Did not advance			
Sathiyan Gnanasekaran	Men	Bye	Almutairi (KSA); W 4–0	Wang Cq (CHN); L 0–4	Did not advance			
Manika Batra	Women	Bye	Shrestha (NEP); W 4–0	Sawettabut (THA); W 4–2	Wang Yd (CHN); L 2–4	Did not advance		
Sreeja Akula	Women	Bye	Pyon S-g (PRK); L 0–4	Did not advance				

=== Doubles ===
Athlete	Event	Round of 64	Round of 32	Round of 16	Quarterfinal	Semi-final	Final	
Athlete	Event	Opposition Score	Opposition Score	Opposition Score	Opposition Score	Opposition Score	Opposition Score	Rank
Sharath Kamal; Sathiyan Gnanasekaran	Men	Bye	Gankhuyag / Munkh-Ochir (MGL); W 3–0	Fan Zd / Wang Cq (CHN); L 0–3	Did not advance			
Manav Thakkar; Manush Shah	Men	Nuchchart / Thanmathikom (THA); W 3–2	Ahmed / Ismail (MDV); W 3–1	Pang / Quek (SGP); W 3–2	Jang W-j / Lim J-h (KOR); L 2–3	Did not advance		
Sutirtha Mukherjee; Ayhika Mukherjee	Women	—N/a	Akasheva / Lavrova (KAZ); W 3–0	Aueawiriyayothin / Sawettabut (THA); W 3–0	Chen M / Wang Yd (CHN); W 3–1	Cha S-y / Pak S-g (PRK); L 3–4	Did not advance	3rd place, bronze medalist(s)
Diya Chitale; Sreeja Akula	Women	—N/a	Ngọc T M / Nguyễn T N (VIE); W 3–0	Harimoto / Kihara (JPN); L 0–3	Did not advance			
Manika Batra; Sathiyan Gnanasekaran	Mixed	Bye	Sawettabut / Thanmathikom (THA); W 3–1	Zeng J / Chew (SGP); L 2–3	Did not advance			
Sreeja Akula; Harmeet Desai	Mixed	Bye	Cheong C C / Seak H L (MAC); W 3–0	Paranang / Sanguansin (THA); L 0–3	Did not advance			

=== Team ===
Athlete	Event	Group stage				Round of 16	Quarter-finals	Semi-finals	Final	Rank
Athlete	Event	Opposition Score	Opposition Score	Opposition Score	Rank	Opposition Score	Opposition Score	Opposition Score	Opposition Score	Rank
Sharath Kamal; Sathiyan Gnanasekaran; Manav Thakkar; Manush Shah; Harmeet Desai	Men	Yemen (YEM); W 3–0	Singapore (SGP); W 3–1	Tajikistan (TJK); W 3–0	1 Q	Kazakhstan (KAZ); W 3–2	South Korea (KOR); L 0–3	Did not advance		
Manika Batra; Sutirtha Mukherjee; Ayhika Mukherjee; Sreeja Akula; Diya Chitale	Women	Singapore (SGP); W 3–2	Nepal (NEP); W 3–0	—N/a	1 Q	Thailand (THA); L 2–3	Did not advance			

== Tennis ==
=== Lawn tennis ===
On 20 June 2023, the All India Tennis Association announced a 12-member squad for the games, which was trimmed to nine later.

Singles

Athlete	Event	First round	Second round	Third round	Quarter-final	Semi-final	Final	Rank
Athlete	Event	Opposition Score	Opposition Score	Opposition Score	Opposition Score	Opposition Score	Opposition Score	Rank
Sumit Nagal	Men	Bye	Leung (MAC); W 6–0, 6–0	Zhukayev (KAZ); W 7–6^{(11–9)}, 6–4	Zhang Zz (CHN); L 7–6^{(7–3)}, 1–6, 2–6	Did not advance		
Ramkumar Ramanathan	Men	Bye	Isroilov (TJK); W W/O	Watanuki (JPN); L 5–7, 7–6^{(7–5)}, 5–7	Did not advance			
Ankita Raina	Women	Bye	Olimjanova (UZB); W 6–0, 6–0	Karunaratne (HKG); W 6–1, 6–2	Kaji (JPN); L 6–3, 4–6, 4–6	Did not advance		
Rutuja Bhosale	Women	Bye	Sagandykova (KAZ); W 7–6^{(7–2)}, 6–2	Eala (PHI); L 6–7^{(5–7)}, 2–6	Did not advance			

Doubles

Athlete	Event	Round 1	Round 2	Round 3	Quarter-final	Semi-final	Final	Rank
Athlete	Event	Opposition Score	Opposition Score	Opposition Score	Opposition Score	Opposition Score	Opposition Score	Rank
Rohan Bopanna; Yuki Bhambri	Men	—N/a	Bye	Sultanov / Fomin (UZB); L 6–2, 3–6, [6–10]	Did not advance			
Saketh Myneni; Ramkumar Ramanathan	Men	—N/a	Bastola / Khadka (NEP); W 6–2, 6–3	Susanto / Susanto (INA); W 6–3, 6–2	Wu Yb / Zhang (CHN); W 6–1, 7–6^{(10–8)}	Hong S-c / Kwon S-w (KOR); W 6–1, 6–7^{(6–8)}, [10–0]	Hsu Y-h / Jung (TPE); L 4–6, 4–6	2nd place, silver medalist(s)
Ankita Raina; Prarthana Thombare	Women	—N/a	Bye	Chanta / Kovapitukted (THA); L 5–7, 2–6	Did not advance			
Karman Thandi; Rutuja Bhosale	Women	—N/a	Rustemova / Sagandykova (KAZ); W 6–4, 6–2	Chong / Wong (HKG); L 4–6, 1–6	Did not advance			
Yuki Bhambri; Ankita Raina	Mixed	Bye	Khan / Khan (PAK); W 6–0, 6–0	Eala / Alcantara (PHI); L 4–6, 6–4, [8–10]	Did not advance			
Rohan Bopanna; Rutuja Bhosale	Mixed	Bye	Amanmuradova / Shin (UZB); W 6–2, 6–4	Hazawa / Shimizu (JPN); W 6–3, 6–4	Kulambayeva / Lomakin (KAZ); W 7–5, 6–3	Chan H-c / Hsu Y-h (TPE); W 6–1, 3–6, [10–4]	Liang E-s / Huang T-h (TPE); W 2–6, 6–3, [10–4]	1st place, gold medalist(s)

==== Soft tennis ====
Men

Athlete	Event	Preliminary Round					Second Stage	Quarterfinal	Semi-final	Final	
Athlete	Event	Opposition Score	Opposition Score	Opposition Score	Opposition Score	Rank	Opposition Score	Opposition Score	Opposition Score	Opposition Score	Rank
Jay Meena	Singles	Chen Y-h (TPE); W 4–2	Alibasa (INA); W 4–1	—N/a		1 Q	Bye	Chang (TPE); L 1–4	Did not advance		
Aniket Patel	Singles	Moralde (PHI); L 0–4	Nguyễn N Q (VIE); W 4–0	—N/a		2 Q	Chang (TPE); L 0–4	Did not advance			
Jay Meena; Aniket Patel; Rajveer Amaliyar; Aditya Dubey; Rohit Dhiman	Team	Thailand (THA); L 1–2	Cambodia (CAM); W 3–0	South Korea (KOR); L 1–2	Chinese Taipei (TPE); L 1–2	4	—N/a		Did not advance		

Women

Athlete	Event	Preliminary Round					Quarterfinal	Semi-final	Final	
Athlete	Event	Opposition Score	Opposition Score	Opposition Score	Opposition Score	Rank	Opposition Score	Opposition Score	Opposition Score	Rank
Aadhya Tiwari	Singles	Lo S-t (TPE); L 1–4	Lee M-s (KOR); L 0–4	—N/a		3	Did not advance			
Raga Sri Manogarbabu	Singles	Ki Mc (CAM); W 4–1	Nguyên T M H (VIE); W 4–0	—N/a		1 Q	Ma Y (CHN); L 1–4	Did not advance		
Aadhya Tiwari; Tushita Singh; Nikita Bishnoi; Raga Manogarbabu; Anusha Nelakuditi	Team	Mongolia (MGL); W 3–0	Japan (JPN); L 0–3	Vietnam (VIE); W 3–0	China (CHN); L 1–2	3	—N/a	Did not advance		

Mixed

Athlete	Event	Preliminary Round				Quarterfinal	Semi-final	Final	
Athlete	Event	Opposition Score	Opposition Score	Opposition Score	Rank	Opposition Score	Opposition Score	Opposition Score	Rank
Jay Meena; Aadhya Tiwari	Doubles	Yu K-w / Cheng C-l (TPE); L 1–5	Talatayod / Mañalac (PHI); L 3–5	—N/a	3	Did not advance			
Aniket Patel; Raga Sri Manogarbabu	Doubles	Lin W-c / Huang S-y (TPE); L 0–5	Kim H-s / Mun H-g (KOR); L 0–5	Arcilla / Sañosa (PHI); W 5–3	3	Did not advance			

== Volleyball ==
A squad of 24 members was selected for Volleyball tournaments.

Team	Event	Group stage			Round of 12	Quarterfinal / Classification	Semi-final / Classification	Final/ BM/ Classification	
Team	Event	Opposition Score	Opposition Score	Rank	Opposition Score	Opposition Score	Opposition Score	Opposition Score	Rank
India men's	Men's tournament	Cambodia; W 3–0	South Korea; W 3–2	1 Q	Chinese Taipei; W 3–0	Japan; L 0–3	Did not advance	Pakistan; L 0–3	6
India women's	Women's tournament	North Korea; L 1–3	China; L 0–3	3	Did not advance	Nepal; W 3–1	Mongolia; W 3–0	Hong Kong; W 3–2	9

=== Men's tournament ===
Squad

1. Vinit Kumar (Captain)
2. Amit Gulia
3. Shameemudhin Ammarambath
4. Muthusamy Appavu
5. Hari Prasad
6. Manoj Manjunath
7. Rohit Kumar
8. Mohan Ukkrapandian
9. Ashwal Rai
10. Santhosh Anthony Raj
11. Guru Prasanth Subramanian
12. Erin Varghese

Group C

Pos	Team	Pld	W	L	Pts	SW	SL	SR	SPW	SPL	SPR	Qualification
1	India	2	2	0	5	6	2	3.000	191	162	1.179	Final round
2	South Korea	2	1	1	4	5	3	1.667	191	167	1.144	Final round
3	Cambodia	2	0	2	0	0	6	0.000	97	150	0.647	

Source: AVC

Date	Time		Score		Set 1	Set 2	Set 3	Set 4	Set 5	Total	Report
19 Sep	19:00	India	3–0	Cambodia	25–14	25–13	25–19			75–46	Report
20 Sep	19:00	South Korea	2–3	India	27–25	27–29	22–25	25–20	15–17	116–116	Report

Final Round

Date	Time		Score		Set 1	Set 2	Set 3	Set 4	Set 5	Total	Report
22 Sep	14:30	India	3–0	Chinese Taipei	25–22	25–22	25–21			75–65	Report
24 Sep	14:30	India	0–3	Japan	16–25	18–25	17–25			51–75	Report
26 Sep	18:30	India	0–3	Pakistan	21–25	20–25	23–25			64–75	Report

=== Women's tournament ===
Squad

1. Nirmal Tanwar
2. Soorya S Pillai
3. Minimol Abraham
4. Jincy Johnson
5. Anushree Poylil
6. Ashwini Kandoth
7. Jini Shaji
8. Saranya Narikunnil
9. Shilpa Nair
10. Ashwathi Raveendran
11. Shalini Sarvanan
12. Suji Vijayan

Group A

Pos	Team	Pld	W	L	Pts	SW	SL	SR	SPW	SPL	SPR	Qualification
1	China	2	2	0	6	6	0	MAX	150	63	2.381	Classification / Pool E–F
2	North Korea	2	1	1	3	3	4	0.750	134	155	0.865	Classification / Pool E–F
3	India	2	0	2	0	1	6	0.167	107	173	0.618	Classification / Pool G–H

Source: OCA

Date	Time		Score		Set 1	Set 2	Set 3	Set 4	Set 5	Total	Report
30 Sep	10:30	India	1–3	North Korea	25–23	22–25	17–25	16–25		80–98	Report
01 Oct	19:00	China	3–0	India	25–9	25–9	25–9			75–27	Report

Classification

Pos	Team	Pld	W	L	Pts	SW	SL	SR	SPW	SPL	SPR	Qualification
1	India	1	1	0	3	3	1	3.000	101	91	1.110	Classification 9th–12th
2	Nepal	1	0	1	0	1	3	0.333	91	101	0.901	Classification 9th–12th

Source: OCA

Date	Time		Score		Set 1	Set 2	Set 3	Set 4	Set 5	Total	Report
04 Oct	10:30	India	3–1	Nepal	25–23	26–28	25–23	25–17		101–91	Report
06 Oct	10:30	India	3–0	Mongolia	25–16	25–20	25–17			75–53	Report
07 Oct	10:30	India	3–2	Hong Kong	25–18	18–25	20–25	25–19	15–9	103–96	Report

== Weightlifting ==
The Indian Weightlifting Federation announced a four-member squad for the Asian Games. Later it was announced that only two women weightlifters will participate in the Games.

=== Women ===
Athlete	Event	Snatch		Clean & Jerk		Total	Rank
Athlete	Event	Result	Rank	Result	Rank	Total	Rank
Mirabai Chanu	49 kg	83	6	108	4	191	4
Bindyarani Devi	55 kg	83	9	113	4	196	5

== Wrestling ==
Key:

- VFA – Victory by Fall
- VPO – Victory by Points – without any point scored by opponent
- VPO1 – Victory by Points – with point(s) scored by opponent
- VSU – Victory by technical superiority – without any point scored by the opponent
- VSU1 – Victory by technical superiority – with point(s) scored by the opponent

=== Freestyle ===
Men

Athlete	Event	Round of 32	Round of 16	Quarterfinals	Semi-finals	Repechage 1	Repechage 2	Final/BM	Rank
Athlete	Event	Opposition Result	Opposition Result	Opposition Result	Opposition Result	Opposition Result	Opposition Result	Opposition Result	Rank
Aman Sehrawat	57 kg	Bye	Kim S-g (KOR); W 6–1^{VPO1}	Khari (IRI); W 19–8^{VSU1}	Hasegawa (JPN); L 10–12^{VPO1}	—N/a		Liu (CHN); W 11–0^{VSU}	3rd place, bronze medalist(s)
Bajrang Punia	65 kg	Bye	Tubog (PHI); W 10–0^{VSU}	Alibegov (BRN); W 4–0^{VPO}	Amouzad (IRI); L 1–8^{VPO1}	—N/a		Yamaguchi (JPN); L 0–10^{VSU}	5
Yash Tushir	74 kg	Bye	Chheang (CAM); W 10–0^{VSU}	Evloev (TJK); L 1–12^{VSU1}	Did not advance				
Deepak Punia	86 kg	Sharipov (BRN); W 3–2^{VPO1}	Riandesta (INA); W 11–0^{VSU}	Shota (JPN); W 7–3^{VPO1}	Shapiev (UZB); W 4–3^{VPO1}	—N/a		Yazdani Charati (IRI); L 0–10^{VSU}	2nd place, silver medalist(s)
Vicky Hooda	97 kg	—N/a	Yergali (KAZ); L 0–10^{VSU}	Did not advance					
Sumit Malik	125 kg	—N/a	Lazarev (KGZ); L 0–10^{VSU}	Did not advance					

Women

Athlete	Event	Round of 16	Quarterfinals	Semi-finals	Repechage	Final/BM	Rank
Athlete	Event	Opposition Result	Opposition Result	Opposition Result	Opposition Result	Opposition Result	Rank
Pooja Gehlot	50 kg	Esati (THA); W 10–0^{VSU}	Tsogt-Ochir (MGL); W 5–1^{VPO1}	Yoshimoto (JPN); L 0–10^{VSU}	—N/a	Keunimjaeva (UZB); L 2–9^{VPO1}	5
Antim Panghal	53 kg	Immaeva (UZB); W 11–0^{VSU}	Fujinami (JPN); L 0–6^{VPO}	Did not advance	Bye	Bat-Ochir (MGL); W 3–1^{VPO1}	3rd place, bronze medalist(s)
Mansi Ahlawat	57 kg	Bye	Sakurai (JPN); L 2–6^{VPO1}	Did not advance	Bark J-g (KOR); W 2–0^{VPO}	Sobirova (UZB); L 0–2^{VPO}	5
Sonam Malik	62 kg	Chand (NEP); W 10–0^{VSU}	Soeurn (CAM); W 10–0^{VSU}	Mun (PRK); L 0–7^{VFA}	—N/a	Long (CHN); W 7–5^{VPO1}	3rd place, bronze medalist(s)
Radhika Hooda	68 kg	Bye	Enkhsaikhan (MGL); L 5–10^{VPO1}	Did not advance			7
Kiran Bishnoi	76 kg	Bye	Yamamoto (JPN); W 3–0^{VPO}	Bakbergenova (KAZ); L 2–4^{VFA}	—N/a	Ganbat (MGL); W 6–3^{VPO1}	3rd place, bronze medalist(s)

=== Greco–Roman ===
Athlete	Event	Round of 16	Quarterfinals	Semi-finals	Repechage	BM	Rank
Athlete	Event	Opposition Result	Opposition Result	Opposition Result	Opposition Result	Opposition Result	Rank
Gyanender Dahiya	60 kg	Dalkhani (IRI); L 1–7^{VPO1}	Did not advance				
Neeraj Dahiya	67 kg	Bakhshilloev (UZB); L 3–5^{VPO1}	Did not advance				
Vikas Dalal	77 kg	Bye	Liu (CHN); L 1–9^{VPO1}	Did not advance			
Sunil Kumar	87 kg	Peng F (CHN); W 4–3^{VPO1}	Abdulkhaev (TJK); W 9–1^{VPO1}	Alizadeh (IRI); L 1–5^{VPO1}	—N/a	Azisbekov (KGZ); W 2–1^{VPO1}	3rd place, bronze medalist(s)
Narinder Cheema	97 kg	Bye	Lee S-y (KOR); L 1–3^{VPO1}	Did not advance			
Naveen Kumar	130 kg	—N/a	Meng Lz (CHN); L 0–3^{VPO}	Did not advance	Loh (SGP); W 9–0^{VPO}	Kim M-s (KOR); L 1–5^{VPO1}	5

== See also ==
- India at the 2022 Asian Para Games
