= Mini Narwal =

Indian kabaddi player

Mini Narwal is an Indian kabaddi player from Haryana. She plays for the Indian women's national kabaddi team and for Railways in the domestic tournaments. She is a raider.

== Early life ==
Narwal is from Rindhana village, Sonipat district, Haryana. Her teammate, Pooja Narwal, is also from the same village. Her coaches at the Sports Authority of India National Centre of Excellence, Bahalgarh, Sonipat, are Kamala Solanki and Navin Kumar. Earlier, she trained under Rambhaj Narwal, from whom she learnt her basics.

== Career ==
She was a part of the Indian women's national kabaddi team that won gold in the Women's Kabaddi World Cup 2025 at Bangladesh in November 2025.

Led by the local MLA, both the players received a warm welcome after returning from the World Cup victory in Bangladesh, at the Irrigation department's guest house in Gohana, and were taken to their village in a convoy of tractors.
