= Artistic roller skating at the 2022 Asian Games – Women's free skating =

Women's free skating at the 2022 Asian Games
- Venue: Qiantang Roller Sports Centre
- Date: 6–7 October 2023
- Competitors: 7 from 5 nations

Medalists
gold medal	Hung Hsiao-ching	Chinese Taipei
silver medal	Miki Fujikura	Japan
bronze medal	Chang Chih-ju	Chinese Taipei

The women's artistic free skating competition at the 2022 Asian Games took place from 6 to 7 October 2023 at the Qiantang Roller Sports Centre.

== Schedule ==
All times are China Standard Time (UTC+08:00)

Date	Time	Event
Friday, 6 October 2023	14:00	Short program
Saturday,7 October 2023	11:00	Long program

== Results ==
Rank	Athlete	SP	LP	Total
1st place, gold medalist(s)	Hung Hsiao-ching (TPE)	38.76	55.62	94.38
2nd place, silver medalist(s)	Miki Fujikura (JPN)	27.41	56.06	83.47
3rd place, bronze medalist(s)	Chang Chih-ju (TPE)	26.53	52.98	79.51
4	Shin Seo-woo (KOR)	18.85	31.59	50.44
5	Akula Sai Samhitha (IND)	16.95	32.69	49.64
6	Greeshma Dontara (IND)	20.94	28.70	49.64
7	Hannah Simajaya (INA)	11.03	13.04	24.07
