= Inline freestyle skating at the 2022 Asian Games – Mixed slalom pair =

Mixed slalom pair at the 2022 Asian Games
- Venue: Qiantang Roller Sports Centre
- Date: 4 October 2023
- Competitors: 14 from 5 nations

Medalists
gold medal	Zhang Hao; Zhu Siyi	China
silver medal	Taiki Shibagaki; Mika Moritoki	Japan
bronze medal	Wattapong Kongpan; Natnanda Pasutanavin	Thailand

The mixed inline slalom pair competition at the 2022 Asian Games took place on 4 October 2023 at the Qiantang Roller Sports Centre.

== Schedule ==
All times are China Standard Time (UTC+08:00)

Date	Time	Event
Wednesday, 4 October 2023	14:00	Final

== Results ==
Rank	Team	Pen.	Judges					Win sum
Rank	Team	Pen.	1	2	3	4	5	Win sum
1st place, gold medalist(s)	Zhang Hao / Zhu Siyi (CHN)	0	1	3	1	1	1	6
2nd place, silver medalist(s)	Taiki Shibagaki / Mika Moritoki (JPN)	3	2	1	2	3	3	5
3rd place, bronze medalist(s)	Wattapong Kongpan / Natnanda Pasutanavin (THA)	0	4	2	4	3	2	3.5
4	Chou Po-wei / Chiu Yin-hsuan (TPE)	3	4	4	3	2	6	3
5	Hsieh Mu-lun / Hou An-yu (TPE)	3	3	4	5	5	4	2.5
6	Paniti Poungsaijai / Sirinthip Rak-akson (THA)	4	6	6	7	6	5	1
7	Jinesh Satyan Nanal / Shreyasi Joshi (IND)	4	7	7	6	7	7	0
