= Snehal Shinde =

Indian kabaddi player

Personal information
- Full name: Snehal Pradeep Shinde
- Nationality: Indian
- Born: 29 April 1992 (age 34)
- Height: 1.60 m (5 ft 3 in)
Medal record
Women's kabaddi
Representing India
Asian Games
Gold medal – first place	2022 Hangzhou	Team

Snehal Pradeep Shinde (born 29 April 1992) is an Indian kabaddi player. She was part of the team that won the gold medal at the 2022 Asian Games, after defeating Chinese Taipei in the final 26–24 on 7 October 2023.

== Personal life ==
Shinde hails from Maharashtra. Her parents are Surekha and Pradeep, a national medallist in boxing. She married Sagar Sakhare. She has a brother, Nikhil, and a sister, Kishori, also a kabaddi player, who inspired her to take up the game. She started playing kabaddi at the age of seven at the club in Swargate, and learnt the basics from coaches Rajesh Dhamdhere and Jayant Warghade. She plans to start an academy for young players.

== Career ==
Shinde's first international medal came as a junior when she was part of the Indian team that won the Junior Asian Championship in Malaysia in 2009. Later, she won gold as part of the senior India team at the South Asian Games held at Assam in 2017. She missed the Asian Games in 2014 and 2018 due to injuries and was keen on taking part in the 2022 Games.

She led the Maharashtra team at the 36th National Games in Gujarat in 2022.

== Awards ==
Shinde received the Shiv Chhatrapati Award, the highest sports award in Maharashtra, for 2014.
