= Tejaswini Singh =

Indian journalist

Tejaswini singh
- Born: 13 December 1989 (age 36); Ayodhya, India
- Education: University of Lucknow; Sikkim Manipal University
- Occupations: Model, journalist, entrepreneur
- Height: 5 ft 8 in (173 cm)
- Spouse: Piyush Upadhyay
- Beauty pageant titleholder
- Title: Mrs India International 2018; Mrs Global World
- Hair color: Black
- Eye color: Black
- Major competitions: Mrs. India International 2018 (Winner); Mrs. Global International World 2018 (Winner)
- Website: tejaswinisingh.info

Tejaswini Singh (born 13 December 1989) is an Indian model, journalist, and beauty pageant titleholder, who was crowned Mrs. International 2018 and Mrs. Global International World 2018. She is also a well known journalist, organic treatment researcher, News channel panelist, feature writer and founder of Organic Greens & Botanical Naturopathy.

== Career ==
In January 2018, Singh participated in the competition of Mrs. India International, which was held in Singapore, where she won the title of the event. She also gained the title of Mrs. Most Beautiful Body. The pageant consisted of 23 contestants from various parts of India.

In September 2018, Tejaswini Singh won the title of Misses Global International World 2018, held in Johannesburg, South Africa.

In March 2019, she featured in the book Shifting Goalpost, which was revealed at Harvard University Conference 2019 in Boston. Singh has written the chapter Trend change from chemical and synthetic to herbal personal care products.

Singh is the founder of a company called Organic Green & Botaniqal Naturopathy, which provides herbal products. She is the founder of the project "Karna", an initiative to help researchers. She was awarded the National Iconic Women's Award by Infopark Society in April 2019.

In 2021, Tejaswini Singh has been conferred an honorary doctorate degree by Keisie University, USA. she has been given this honor for his special research in herbal field and for inventing formulas of about one thousand herbal products. The herbal paste Formula prepared by her. has proved effective in many skin related diseases. A research paper regarding this product was recently published in the International Journal of Ayurvedic and Pharma Research.

Tejaswini Singh was selected at the Dubai for Global Conclave and Festival of Action “Judge Panel” and represented India by Milestone International Organisation.

Tejaswini Singh was selected from India in the judges panel selected from five countries from all over the world in the Dubai Global Conclave and Global Awards. Her Majesty Mona from the Royal Family of Dubai will be among the selected women from five countries in this 3-day conclave organized by the Milestone Foundation in Dubai. Also, to make Tejaswini an effective herbal product.

Along with this, Tejaswini was given the Inspriration Global Award at the hands of His Highness Suhail Al Zarooni, Royal Family of Dubai, for making an effective herbal product. As a jury, Tejaswini raised the issue of education of girls going on in developing countries as a panelist and judge in this three-day program at Bahi Ajman Palace.

== Pageants ==
Year	Title(s)	Status	Source
2018	Mrs. India International	Winner	
2018	Mrs. Global International	Winner	
2018	Mrs. Global International	Mrs. Most Beautiful Body	
2016	Mrs. Uttar Pradesh	Mrs. Bold & Beautiful	

Awards and achievements
Preceded by (India) Neetu Prabhakar	Mrs. India International; 2018	Succeeded by Incumbent
Preceded by (Philippines) Joan Babilonia	Mrs. Global International; 2018	Succeeded by Incumbent
