= Akshima Singh =

Indian kabaddi player

Personal information
- Nationality: Indian

Sport
- Sport: Kabaddi
Medal record
Women's Kabaddi
Representing India
Asian Games
Gold medal – first place	2022 Hangzhou	Women's team

Akshima Singh is an Indian kabaddi player. She was part of the team that won the gold medal at the 2022 Asian Games.
