= Akash Shinde =

Indian kabaddi player

Personal information
- Full name: Akash Santosh Shinde
- Nickname: Sky Shinde
- Nationality: Indian
- Born: 7 March 2001 (age 25)
- Years active: 23
- Height: 180 cm (5 ft 11 in)
- Weight: 74 kg (163 lb)

Sport
- Country: India
- Sport: Kabaddi
- League: Pro Kabaddi League
- Team: Bengaluru Bulls
Medal record
Men's Kabaddi
Representing India
Asian Games
Gold medal – first place	2022 Hangzhou	Team

Akash Santosh Shinde (born 7 March 2001) is an Indian professional Kabaddi player from Nashik, Maharashtra who plays in the Pro Kabaddi League. He plays as a left raider for Bengaluru Bulls in PKL. He was selected for the Indian team for the 2022 Asian Games.

== Career ==
Akash was a part of the Indian team that won the gold medal in the Kabaddi finals at the 2022 Asian Games. They beat Iran in a controversial final 33–29.

Currently, he has been signed by Bengaluru Bulls for their 2025 campaign of PKL. He'll be seen playing for the franchise in the upcoming season.
