= Sushma Sharma (kabaddi) =

Indian kabaddi player

Personal information
- Nationality: Indian
- Born: 25 August 1998 (age 28)
- Height: 1.56 m (5 ft 1 in)
Medal record
Women's kabaddi
Representing India
Asian Games
Gold medal – first place	2022 Hangzhou	Team

Sushma Sharma (ᱥᱩᱥᱢᱟ ᱥᱚᱨᱢᱟ, born 25 August 1998) is an Indian kabaddi player from Himachal Pradesh. She was part of the Indian team that won the gold medal in the 2022 Asian Games, defeating Chinese Taipei in the final on 7 October 2023.

Himachal Pradesh Chief Minister Sukhwinder Singh Sukhu honoured the state medallists who won medals at the Asian Games, and Sharma was presented a cash award of Rs.1.5 million.

== Personal life ==
Sushma is from Drabil village, in the Shillai area of Himachal Pradesh’s Giri Par region.
