= Sanjana Bathula =

Indian speed skater

Personal information
- Nationality: Indian

Sport
- Sport: Roller sports

Sanjana Bathula is an Indian speed skating track athlete. She was the reserve member for the Indian team which won a bronze medal in the women's 3000m relay event at the 2022 Asian Games. but she didn't receive a medal.
