= Nidhi Sharma =

Indian kabaddi player

Personal information
- Nationality: Indian
- Born: 2 May 1997 (age 29)
- Height: 1.62 m (5 ft 4 in)
Medal record
Women's kabaddi
Representing India
Asian Games
Gold medal – first place	2022 Hangzhou	Team
Asian Championship
Gold medal – first place	2025 Iran	Team

Nidhi Sharma (born 2 May 1997) is an Indian kabaddi player. She was part of the team that won the gold medal at the 2022 Asian Games.
