= Pooja Narwal =

Indian kabaddi player

Personal information
- Nationality: Indian
- Born: 15 March 2000 (age 26)
- Height: 1.69 m (5 ft 7 in)
Medal record
Women's kabaddi
Representing India
Asian Games
Gold medal – first place	2022 Hangzhou	Team

Pooja Narwal (ᱯᱩᱡᱟ ᱱᱟᱨᱣᱟᱞ, born 15 March 2000) is an Indian kabaddi player from Delhi. She was part of the team that won the gold medal at the 2022 Asian Games.

She also represented the Indian women's national kabaddi team that won gold in the Women's Kabaddi World Cup 2025 at Bangladesh in November 2025.
