= List of Asian Games medalists in roller sports =

This is the complete list of Asian Games medalists in roller sports from 2010 to 2026.

== Artistic ==
=== Men's free skating ===
Games	Gold	Silver	Bronze
2010 Guangzhou	Shingo Nishiki (JPN)	Yeh Chia-chen (TPE)	Anup Kumar Yama (IND)

=== Women's free skating ===
Games	Gold	Silver	Bronze
2010 Guangzhou	Wang Hsiao-chu (TPE)	Dong Zhidou (CHN)	Lin Meijiao (CHN)
2022 Hangzhou	Hung Hsiao-ching (TPE)	Miki Fujikura (JPN)	Chang Chih-ju (TPE)

=== Pairs ===
Games	Gold	Silver	Bronze
2010 Guangzhou	China (CHN); Tang Yunqin; Lin Yawen	Chinese Taipei (TPE); Chen Li-hsin; Weng Tzu-hsia	India (IND); Anup Kumar Yama; Avani Panchal

== Inline freestyle ==
=== Men's speed slalom ===
Games	Gold	Silver	Bronze
2022 Hangzhou	Wang Yu-chun (TPE)	Zhang Hao (CHN)	Huang Pin-ruei (TPE)

=== Women's speed slalom ===
Games	Gold	Silver	Bronze
2022 Hangzhou	Liu Chiao-hsi (TPE)	Taraneh Ahmadi (IRI)	Ting Yu-en (TPE)

=== Mixed slalom pair ===
Games	Gold	Silver	Bronze
2022 Hangzhou	China (CHN); Zhang Hao; Zhu Siyi	Japan (JPN); Taiki Shibagaki; Mika Moritoki	Thailand (THA); Wattapong Kongpan; Natnanda Pasutanavin

== Skateboarding ==
=== Men's park ===
Games	Gold	Silver	Bronze
2018 Jakarta–Palembang	Kensuke Sasaoka (JPN)	Jason Dennis Lijnzaat (INA)	Pevi Permana Putra (INA)
2022 Hangzhou	Chen Ye (CHN)	Yuro Nagahara (JPN)	Kensuke Sasaoka (JPN)
2026 Aichi–Nagoya	Izuru Nagahara (JPN)	Ku Yong-yan (TPE)	Gunjo Shiji (JPN)

=== Men's street ===
Games	Gold	Silver	Bronze
2018 Jakarta–Palembang	Keyaki Ike (JPN)	Sanggoe Darma Tanjung (INA)	Eun Ju-won (KOR)
2022 Hangzhou	Zhang Jie (CHN)	Sanggoe Darma Tanjung (INA)	Su Jianjun (CHN)
2026 Aichi–Nagoya	Kang Jun-i (KOR)	Toa Sasaki (JPN)	Ginwoo Onodera (JPN)

=== Women's park ===
Games	Gold	Silver	Bronze
2018 Jakarta–Palembang	Sakura Yosozumi (JPN)	Kaya Isa (JPN)	Zhang Xin (CHN)
2022 Hangzhou	Hinano Kusaki (JPN)	Li Yujuan (CHN)	Mao Jiasi (CHN)
2026 Aichi–Nagoya	Mizuho Hasegawa (JPN)	Lin Yi-fan (TPE)	Misugu Okamoto (JPN)

=== Women's street ===
Games	Gold	Silver	Bronze
2018 Jakarta–Palembang	Margielyn Didal (PHI)	Kaya Isa (JPN)	Bunga Nyimas (INA)
2022 Hangzhou	Cui Chenxi (CHN)	Zeng Wenhui (CHN)	Miyu Ito (JPN)
2026 Aichi–Nagoya	Zhu Yuanling (CHN)	Yumeka Oda (JPN)	Cui Chenxi (CHN)

== Speed road ==
=== Men's 20000 m elimination ===
Games	Gold	Silver	Bronze
2018 Jakarta–Palembang	Chao Tsu-cheng (TPE)	Choi Gwang-ho (KOR)	Son Geun-seong (KOR)

=== Women's 20000 m elimination ===
Games	Gold	Silver	Bronze
2018 Jakarta–Palembang	Li Meng-chu (TPE)	Guo Dan (CHN)	Yang Ho-chen (TPE)

== Speed track ==
=== Men's 300 m time trial ===
Games	Gold	Silver	Bronze
2010 Guangzhou	Sung Ching-yang (TPE)	Lo Wei-lin (TPE)	Jang Su-chul (KOR)

=== Men's 500 m sprint ===
Games	Gold	Silver	Bronze
2010 Guangzhou	Sung Ching-yang (TPE)	Lo Wei-lin (TPE)	Eum Han-jun (KOR)

=== Men's 1000 m sprint ===
Games	Gold	Silver	Bronze
2022 Hangzhou	Choi Gwang-ho (KOR)	Jung Cheol-won (KOR)	Chao Tsu-cheng (TPE)

=== Men's 10000 m points elimination ===
Games	Gold	Silver	Bronze
2010 Guangzhou	Son Geun-seong (KOR)	Choi Gwang-ho (KOR)	Cong Siyuan (CHN)
2022 Hangzhou	Jeong Byeong-hee (KOR)	Zhang Zhenhai (CHN)	Choi In-ho (KOR)

=== Men's 3000 m relay ===
Games	Gold	Silver	Bronze
2022 Hangzhou	Chinese Taipei (TPE); Chen Yan-cheng; Chao Tsu-cheng; Huang Yu-lin; Ko Fu-shiuan	South Korea (KOR); Choi In-ho; Choi Gwang-ho; Jung Cheol-won	India (IND); Anandkumar Velkumar; Siddhant Kamble; Vikram Ingale

=== Women's 300 m time trial ===
Games	Gold	Silver	Bronze
2010 Guangzhou	An Yi-seul (KOR)	Zang Yinglu (CHN)	Li Wenwen (CHN)

=== Women's 500 m sprint ===
Games	Gold	Silver	Bronze
2010 Guangzhou	Huang Yu-ting (TPE)	An Yi-seul (KOR)	Zang Yinglu (CHN)

=== Women's 1000 m sprint ===
Games	Gold	Silver	Bronze
2022 Hangzhou	Li Meng-chu (TPE)	Liu Yi-hsuan (TPE)	Lee Ye-rim (KOR)

=== Women's 10000 m points elimination ===
Games	Gold	Silver	Bronze
2010 Guangzhou	Woo Hyo-sook (KOR)	Guo Dan (CHN)	Pan Yi-chin (TPE)
2022 Hangzhou	Shih Pei-yu (TPE)	Yang Ho-chen (TPE)	Yu Ga-ram (KOR)

=== Women's 3000 m relay ===
Games	Gold	Silver	Bronze
2022 Hangzhou	Chinese Taipei (TPE); Liu Yi-hsuan; Li Meng-chu; Yang Ho-chen	South Korea (KOR); Lee Seul; Park Min-jeong; Lee Ye-rim	India (IND); Karthika Jagadeeshwaran; Heeral Sadhu; Aarathy Kasturi Raj
