= Roller sports at the Asian Games =

- Governing bodies: WSK (World) / WSA (Asia)
- Events: 4 (men: 2; women: 2)

Games
- 1951; 1954; 1958; 1962; 1966; 1970; 1974; 1978; 1982; 1986; 1990; 1994; 1998; 2002; 2006; 2010; 2014; 2018; 2022; 2026
- Medalists

Roller sports was an event in the Asian Games for the first time in 2010, when the games were held in Guangzhou, China.

== Editions ==
Games	Year	Host city	Best nation
XVI	2010	Guangzhou, China	Chinese Taipei
XVII	2018	Jakarta–Palembang, Indonesia	Japan
XIX	2022	Hangzhou, China	Chinese Taipei
XX	2026	Aichi–Nagoya, Japan	Japan

== Events ==
Event	10	18	22	26	Years
Artistic
Men's free skating	X				1
Women's free skating	X		X		2
Pairs	X				1
Inline freestyle
Men's speed slalom			X		1
Women's speed slalom			X		1
Mixed pair slalom			X		1
Skateboarding
Men's park		X	X	X	3
Men's street		X	X	X	3
Women's park		X	X	X	3
Women's street		X	X	X	3
Speed road
Men's 20000 m elimination		X			1
Women's 20000 m elimination		X			1
Speed track
Men's 300 m time trial	X				1
Men's 500 m sprint	X				1
Men's 1000 m sprint			X		1
Men's 10000 m points elimination	X		X		2
Men's 3000 m relay			X		1
Women's 300 m time trial	X				1
Women's 500 m sprint	X				1
Women's 1000 m sprint			X		1
Women's 10000 m points elimination	X		X		2
Women's 3000 m relay			X		1
Total	9	6	14	4	

== Medal table ==
Rank	Nation	Gold	Silver	Bronze	Total
1	Chinese Taipei (TPE)	13	8	6	27
2	Japan (JPN)	7	7	5	19
3	China (CHN)	6	8	8	22
4	South Korea (KOR)	6	6	7	19
5	Philippines (PHI)	1	0	0	1
6	Indonesia (INA)	0	3	2	5
7	Iran (IRI)	0	1	0	1
8	India (IND)	0	0	4	4
9	Thailand (THA)	0	0	1	1
Totals (9 entries)		33	33	33	99

== Participating nations ==
Nation	10	18	22	26	Years
China	16	11	12	8	4
Chinese Taipei	16	6	20	2	4
Hong Kong		4	9	5	3
India	12	4	14		3
Indonesia		10	4	7	3
Iran	2		12	1	3
Japan	2	4	13	8	4
Kazakhstan				3	1
Malaysia		5			1
Mongolia		2			1
Nepal		1		2	2
Philippines		3	5	5	3
Singapore			5		1
South Korea	11	8	17	8	4
Sri Lanka		4			1
Thailand	3	8	23	7	4
Vietnam			5		1
Number of nations	7	13	12	11	
Number of athletes	62	70	139	56	
