= Roller sports at the 2018 Asian Games =

- Venue: Jakabaring Sport City
- Dates: 28–31 August 2018
- Competitors: 70 from 13 nations

Roller sports competitions at the 2018 Asian Games were held at the JSC Rollerskate Stadium and the JSC Skateboard Stadium in Jakabaring Sport City, Palembang, Indonesia from 28 to 31 August 2018.

== Schedule ==
P	Preliminary	F	Final

Event↓/Date →	28th Tue	29th Wed	30th Thu	31st Fri
Skateboarding
Men's park	P	F		
Men's street	P	F		
Women's park		F		
Women's street		F		
Speed
Men's 20000 m elimination				F
Women's 20000 m elimination				F

== Medalists ==
=== Skateboarding ===
Event	Gold	Silver	Bronze
Men's park	Kensuke Sasaoka; Japan	Jason Dennis Lijnzaat; Indonesia	Pevi Permana Putra; Indonesia
Men's street	Keyaki Ike; Japan	Sanggoe Darma Tanjung; Indonesia	Eun Ju-won; South Korea
Women's park	Sakura Yosozumi; Japan	Kaya Isa; Japan	Zhang Xin; China
Women's street	Margielyn Didal; Philippines	Kaya Isa; Japan	Bunga Nyimas; Indonesia

=== Speed ===
Event	Gold	Silver	Bronze
Men's 20000 m elimination	Chao Tsu-cheng; Chinese Taipei	Choi Gwang-ho; South Korea	Son Geun-seong; South Korea
Women's 20000 m elimination	Li Meng-chu; Chinese Taipei	Guo Dan; China	Yang Ho-chen; Chinese Taipei

== Medal table ==
Rank	Nation	Gold	Silver	Bronze	Total
1	Japan (JPN)	3	2	0	5
2	Chinese Taipei (TPE)	2	0	1	3
3	Philippines (PHI)	1	0	0	1
4	Indonesia (INA)	0	2	2	4
5	South Korea (KOR)	0	1	2	3
6	China (CHN)	0	1	1	2
Totals (6 entries)		6	6	6	18

== Participating nations ==
A total of 70 athletes from 13 nations competed in roller sports at the 2018 Asian Games:

- China (11)
- Chinese Taipei (6)
- Hong Kong (4)
- India (4)
- Indonesia (10)
- Japan (4)
- Malaysia (5)
- Mongolia (2)
- Nepal (1)
- Philippines (3)
- South Korea (8)
- Sri Lanka (4)
- Thailand (8)
