= Roller sports at the 2022 Asian Games =

- Venue: Qiantang Roller Sports Centre
- Dates: 24 September – 7 October 2023
- Competitors: 139 from 12 nations

Roller sports competitions at the 2022 Asian Games were held at the Qiantang Roller Sports Centre in Hangzhou, China from 24 September to 7 October 2023.

== Schedule ==
S	Short program	L	Long program	P	Preliminary	F	Final

Event↓/Date →	24th Sun	25th Mon	26th Tue	27th Wed	28th Thu	29th Fri	30th Sat	1st Sun		2nd Mon		3rd Tue	4th Wed	5th Thu		6th Fri	7th Sat
Artistic
Women's free skating																S	L
Inline freestyle
Men's speed slalom														P	F		
Women's speed slalom														P	F		
Mixed slalom pair													F				
Skateboarding
Men's park	P	F															
Men's street			P	F													
Women's park	P	F															
Women's street			P	F													
Speed
Men's 1000 m sprint								P	F								
Men's 10000 m points elimination							F										
Men's 3000 m relay										P	F						
Women's 1000 m sprint								P	F								
Women's 10000 m points elimination							F										
Women's 3000 m relay										F							

== Medalists ==
=== Artistic ===
Event	Gold	Silver	Bronze
Women's free skating	Hung Hsiao-ching; Chinese Taipei	Miki Fujikura; Japan	Chang Chih-ju; Chinese Taipei

=== Inline freestyle ===
Event	Gold	Silver	Bronze
Men's speed slalom	Wang Yu-chun; Chinese Taipei	Zhang Hao; China	Huang Pin-ruei; Chinese Taipei
Women's speed slalom	Liu Chiao-hsi; Chinese Taipei	Taraneh Ahmadi; Iran	Ting Yu-en; Chinese Taipei
Mixed slalom pair	China; Zhang Hao; Zhu Siyi	Japan; Taiki Shibagaki; Mika Moritoki	Thailand; Wattapong Kongpan; Natnanda Pasutanavin

=== Skateboarding ===
Event	Gold	Silver	Bronze
Men's park	Chen Ye; China	Yuro Nagahara; Japan	Kensuke Sasaoka; Japan
Men's street	Zhang Jie; China	Sanggoe Darma Tanjung; Indonesia	Su Jianjun; China
Women's park	Hinano Kusaki; Japan	Li Yujuan; China	Mao Jiasi; China
Women's street	Cui Chenxi; China	Zeng Wenhui; China	Miyu Ito; Japan

=== Men's speed ===
Event	Gold	Silver	Bronze
1000 m sprint	Choi Gwang-ho; South Korea	Jung Cheol-won; South Korea	Chao Tsu-cheng; Chinese Taipei
10000 m points elimination	Jeong Byeong-hee; South Korea	Zhang Zhenhai; China	Choi In-ho; South Korea
3000 m relay	Chinese Taipei; Chen Yan-cheng; Chao Tsu-cheng; Huang Yu-lin; Ko Fu-shiuan	South Korea; Choi In-ho; Choi Gwang-ho; Jung Cheol-won	India; Anandkumar Velkumar; Siddhant Kamble; Vikram Ingale

=== Women's speed ===
Event	Gold	Silver	Bronze
1000 m sprint	Li Meng-chu; Chinese Taipei	Liu Yi-hsuan; Chinese Taipei	Lee Ye-rim; South Korea
10000 m points elimination	Shih Pei-yu; Chinese Taipei	Yang Ho-chen; Chinese Taipei	Yu Ga-ram; South Korea
3000 m relay	Chinese Taipei; Liu Yi-hsuan; Li Meng-chu; Yang Ho-chen	South Korea; Lee Seul; Park Min-jeong; Lee Ye-rim	India; Karthika Jagadeeshwaran; Heeral Sadhu; Aarathy Kasturi Raj

== Medal table ==
Rank	Nation	Gold	Silver	Bronze	Total
1	Chinese Taipei (TPE)	7	2	4	13
2	China (CHN)	4	4	2	10
3	South Korea (KOR)	2	3	3	8
4	Japan (JPN)	1	3	2	6
5	Indonesia (INA)	0	1	0	1
5	Iran (IRI)	0	1	0	1
7	India (IND)	0	0	2	2
8	Thailand (THA)	0	0	1	1
Totals (8 entries)		14	14	14	42

== Participating nations ==
A total of 139 athletes from 12 nations competed in roller sports at the 2022 Asian Games:

- China (12)
- Chinese Taipei (20)
- Hong Kong (9)
- India (14)
- Indonesia (4)
- Iran (12)
- Japan (13)
- Philippines (5)
- Singapore (5)
- South Korea (17)
- Thailand (23)
- Vietnam (5)
