= Sandeep Warrier =

Indian cricketer (born 1991)

Personal information
- Full name: Sankarankutty Sandeep Warrier
- Born: 4 April 1991 (age 35); Thrissur, Kerala, India
- Height: 1.87 m (6 ft 2 in)
- Batting: Right-handed
- Bowling: Right-arm medium-fast
- Role: Bowler
- Relatives: Aarathy Kasturi Raj (wife)

International information
- National side: India (2021)
- Only T20I (cap 92): 29 July 2021 v Sri Lanka
- T20I shirt no.: 22

Domestic team information
- Years: Team
- 2012–2021: Kerala
- 2019–2021: Kolkata Knight Riders (squad no. 63)
- 2021–present: Tamil Nadu
- 2024: Gujarat Titans (squad no. 25)

Career statistics
Competition	FC	LA	T20
Matches	57	55	47
Runs scored	93	16	13
Batting average	2.65	2.28	4.33
100s/50s	0/0	0/0	0/0
Top score	12	4*	7*
Balls bowled	9,830	2,363	1,008
Wickets	186	66	46
Bowling average	24.43	32.37	26.30
5 wickets in innings	11	0	0
10 wickets in match	0	0	0
Best bowling	6/44	4/51	3/19
Catches/stumpings	19/–	9/–	8/–
- Source: ESPNcricinfo, 29 July 2021

Sankarankutty Sandeep Warrier (born 4 April 1991) is an Indian international cricketer. He made his international debut for the Indian cricket team in July 2021 against Sri Lanka. He is a right-arm medium-fast bowler who currently plays for Tamil Nadu in domestic cricket and has played for Kerala as well as Kolkata Knight Riders and Gujarat Titans in the Indian Premier League (IPL).

== Domestic career ==
Sandeep Warrier made his first-class debut for Kerala against Goa on 24 November 2012. In August 2018, he was one of five players that were suspended for three games in the 2018–19 Vijay Hazare Trophy, after showing dissent against Kerala's captain, Sachin Baby. He was the leading wicket-taker for Kerala in the 2018–19 Vijay Hazare Trophy, with twelve dismissals in six matches. He was the leading wicket-taker for Kerala in the group-stage of the 2018–19 Ranji Trophy, with 44 dismissals in ten matches. He took a hat-trick in the 2019 season of Syed Mushtaq Ali T20 Trophy. In August 2019, he was named in the India Red team's squad for the 2019–20 Duleep Trophy. In October 2019, he was named in India A's squad for the 2019–20 Deodhar Trophy. He moved to Tamil Nadu from Kerala on 2021.

== International career ==
In January 2021, he was named as one of five net bowlers in India's Test squad for their series against England. In June 2021, he was named as one of five net bowlers for India's tour of Sri Lanka. Following a positive case for COVID-19 in the Indian team, Warrier was added to India's main squad for their final two Twenty20 International (T20I) matches of the tour. He made his T20I debut on 29 July 2021, for India against Sri Lanka.

== Personal life ==
Sandeep was born on Thrissur to Sankarankutty and Lakshmi. He has a sister, Sandhya. He grew up and did his schooling in Mumbai and later moved to Kerala. He is an engineering dropout.

Sandeep married his long-time girlfriend Aarathy Kasturi Raj, an international skater in 2019. Aarathy won a bronze medal in the women's 3000m relay event at the 2022 Asian Games.

Sandeep, along with his KKR teammate, Varun Chakravarthy, tested positive for COVID-19 on 3 May 2021. The IPL match between Kolkata Knight Riders and Royal Challengers Bangalore scheduled to take place that day was therefore postponed.
