= Roller sports at the 2010 Asian Games =

- Venue: Guangzhou Velodrome
- Dates: 23–26 November 2010
- Competitors: 62 from 7 nations

Roller sports at the 2010 Asian Games were held in Guangzhou Velodrome, Guangzhou, China from 23 to 26 November 2010. Track roller speed skating was held from 23 to 24 November while Artistic roller skating was held from 25 to 26 November.

== Schedule ==
| S | Short program | L | Long program | H | Heats | F | Finals |

| Event↓/Date → | 23rd Tue | | 24th Wed | 25th Thu | 26th Fri |
Artistic
| Men's free skating | | | | S | L |
| Women's free skating | | | | S | L |
| Pairs | | | | S | L |
Speed
| Men's 300 m time trial | F | | | | |
| Men's 500 m sprint | H | F | | | |
| Men's 10000 m points elimination | | | F | | |
| Women's 300 m time trial | F | | | | |
| Women's 500 m sprint | H | F | | | |
| Women's 10000 m points elimination | | | F | | |

== Medalists ==
=== Artistic ===
| Event | Gold | Silver | Bronze |
|---|---|---|---|
| Men's free skating | Shingo Nishiki; Japan | Yeh Chia-chen; Chinese Taipei | Anup Kumar Yama; India |
| Women's free skating | Wang Hsiao-chu; Chinese Taipei | Dong Zhidou; China | Lin Meijiao; China |
| Pairs | China; Tang Yunqin; Lin Yawen | Chinese Taipei; Chen Li-hsin; Weng Tzu-hsia | India; Anup Kumar Yama; Avani Panchal |

=== Men's speed ===
| Event | Gold | Silver | Bronze |
|---|---|---|---|
| 300 m time trial | Sung Ching-yang; Chinese Taipei | Lo Wei-lin; Chinese Taipei | Jang Su-chul; South Korea |
| 500 m sprint | Sung Ching-yang; Chinese Taipei | Lo Wei-lin; Chinese Taipei | Eum Han-jun; South Korea |
| 10000 m points elimination | Son Geun-seong; South Korea | Choi Gwang-ho; South Korea | Cong Siyuan; China |

=== Women's speed ===
| Event | Gold | Silver | Bronze |
|---|---|---|---|
| 300 m time trial | An Yi-seul; South Korea | Zang Yinglu; China | Li Wenwen; China |
| 500 m sprint | Huang Yu-ting; Chinese Taipei | An Yi-seul; South Korea | Zang Yinglu; China |
| 10000 m points elimination | Woo Hyo-sook; South Korea | Guo Dan; China | Pan Yi-chin; Chinese Taipei |

== Medal table ==
| Rank | Nation | Gold | Silver | Bronze | Total |
|---|---|---|---|---|---|
| 1 | Chinese Taipei (TPE) | 4 | 4 | 1 | 9 |
| 2 | South Korea (KOR) | 3 | 2 | 2 | 7 |
| 3 | China (CHN) | 1 | 3 | 4 | 8 |
| 4 | Japan (JPN) | 1 | 0 | 0 | 1 |
| 5 | India (IND) | 0 | 0 | 2 | 2 |
| Totals (5 entries) | | 9 | 9 | 9 | 27 |

== Participating nations ==
A total of 62 athletes from 7 nations competed in roller sports at the 2010 Asian Games:

- China (16)
- Chinese Taipei (16)
- India (12)
- Iran (2)
- Japan (2)
- South Korea (11)
- Thailand (3)
