= Geiny Pájaro =

Colombian speed skater

Geiny Pájaro Guzmán
Personal information
- Born: Colombia

Sport
- Country: Colombia
- Sport: Speed skating
Medal record
Representing Colombia
Event	1st	2nd	3rd
World Championships	8	2	2
World Games	3	0	0
Pan American Games	2	1	1
CAC Games	4	1	0
South American Games	0	1	0
Total	17	5	3
Women's road Inline speed skating
World Championships
Gold medal – first place	2018 Heerde-Arnhem	100 m sprint
Gold medal – first place	2019 Barcelona	100 m sprint
Gold medal – first place	2021 Ibagué	100 m sprint
Gold medal – first place	2021 Ibagué	1 lap sprint
Gold medal – first place	2023 Vicenza	100 m sprint
Gold medal – first place	2025 Beidaihe	100 m sprint
World Games
Gold medal – first place	2022 Birmingham	100 m sprint
Central American and Caribbean Games
Gold medal – first place	2023 San Salvador	100 m sprint
Gold medal – first place	2023 San Salvador	1 lap sprint
Women's track Inline speed skating
World Championships
Gold medal – first place	2019 Barcelona	200 m time trial
Gold medal – first place	2021 Ibagué	200 m time trial
Silver medal – second place	2021 Ibagué	500 m sprint
Silver medal – second place	2025 Beidaihe	200 m time trial
Bronze medal – third place	2018 Heerde-Arnhem	500 m sprint
Bronze medal – third place	2023 Montecchio Maggiore	200 m time trial
World Games
Gold medal – first place	2017 Wroclaw	300 m time trial
Gold medal – first place	2022 Birmingham	200 m time trial
Pan American Games
Gold medal – first place	2019 Lima	500 m sprint
Gold medal – first place	2023 Santiago	200 m time trial
Silver medal – second place	2019 Lima	300 m time trial
Bronze medal – third place	2023 Santiago	500 m sprint
Central American and Caribbean Games
Gold medal – first place	2023 San Salvador	200 m time trial
Gold medal – first place	2023 San Salvador	500 m sprint
Silver medal – second place	2023 San Salvador	1000 m sprint
South American Games
Silver medal – second place	2018 Cochabamba	500 m sprint

Geiny Carmela Pájaro Guzmán is a Colombian inline speedskater who has won medals at the Inline Speed Skating World Championships, Pan American Games and World Games.

== Career ==
Pájaro was one of the athletes of the Colombian delegation at the 2019 Pan American Games held in Lima, Peru, winning a gold medal in the 500-meter category and a silver medal in the 300-meter time trial category.
