= Aryanpal Singh =

Indian athlete

Personal information
- Full name: Aryanpal Singh Ghuman
- Nationality: Indian
- Born: 12 May 2001 (age 25)
- Height: 1.80 m (5 ft 11 in)

Sport
- Sport: Roller sports
- Event: Inline speed skating

Aryanpal Singh Ghuman (born 12 May 2001) is an Indian speed skating track athlete. He was selected for the Indian speed skating team for the 2022 Asian Games in Hangzhou, China. He was the reserve member of the relay team that won the bronze medal in the men's 3000m event along with Vikram Ingale, Siddhant Kamble and Anand Kumar. but he didn't receive a medal.
