= Artistic roller skating at the 2010 Asian Games – Pairs =

Pairs at the 2010 Asian Games
- Venue: Guangzhou Velodrome
- Date: 25–26 November 2010
- Competitors: 10 from 3 nations

Medalists
gold medal	Tang Yunqin; Lin Yawen	China
silver medal	Chen Li-hsin; Weng Tzu-hsia	Chinese Taipei
bronze medal	Anup Kumar Yama; Avani Panchal	India

The women's artistic pairs skating event at the 2010 Asian Games was held in Guangzhou Velodrome, Guangzhou on 25 November and 26 November.

== Schedule ==
All times are China Standard Time (UTC+08:00)

Date	Time	Event
Thursday, 25 November 2010	15:40	Short program
Friday, 26 November 2010	15:50	Long program

== Results ==
Rank	Team	SP	LP	Total
1st place, gold medalist(s)	China (CHN); Tang Yunqin; Lin Yawen	78.8	245.4	324.2
2nd place, silver medalist(s)	Chinese Taipei (TPE); Chen Li-hsin; Weng Tzu-hsia	78.0	237.6	315.6
3rd place, bronze medalist(s)	India (IND); Anup Kumar Yama; Avani Panchal	73.0	222.0	295.0
4	China (CHN); Deng Jinkang; Wang Wenxin	71.9	220.2	292.1
5	Chinese Taipei (TPE); Chien Chia-sheng; Wang Szu-yu	71.8	219.0	290.8
