= Roller speed skating at the 2022 Asian Games – Men's 1000 metres sprint =

Men's 1000 metres sprint at the 2022 Asian Games
- Venue: Qiantang Roller Sports Centre
- Date: 1 October 2023
- Competitors: 16 from 9 nations

Medalists
gold medal	Choi Gwang-ho	South Korea
silver medal	Jung Cheol-won	South Korea
bronze medal	Chao Tsu-cheng	Chinese Taipei

The men's 1000 metres sprint event at the 2022 Asian Games was held in Qiantang Roller Sports Centre, Hangzhou on 1 October 2023.

== Schedule ==
All times are China Standard Time (UTC+08:00)

Date	Time	Event
Sunday, 1 October 2023	09:20	Heats
Sunday, 1 October 2023	10:05	Semifinals
Sunday, 1 October 2023	10:50	Final

== Results ==
Legend

- DNF — Did not finish
- DSQ–SF — Disqualified for sport fault
- EL — Eliminated

=== Heats ===
- Qualification: 16 fastest advance to the semifinals.

Rank	Heat	Athlete	Time
1	1	Huang Yu-lin (TPE)	1:32.216
2	1	Choi Gwang-ho (KOR)	1:32.321
3	1	Vikram Ingale (IND)	1:32.598
4	1	Ryan Chua (SGP)	1:34.405
5	1	Kiarash Shamohammadi (IRI)	1:34.484
6	1	Noppron Choochorngamket (THA)	1:34.610
7	1	Lucas Ng (SGP)	1:34.652
8	2	Jung Cheol-won (KOR)	1:42.298
9	2	Chao Tsu-cheng (TPE)	1:42.299
10	2	Zhang Zhenhai (CHN)	1:42.350
11	2	Aryanpal Singh (IND)	1:42.708
12	2	Mohammad Amin Heidari (IRI)	1:43.066
13	2	Katsuki Kato (JPN)	1:43.068
14	2	Pawarit Nochai (THA)	1:43.565
15	2	Nguyễn Nhựt Linh (VIE)	1:48.043
16	1	Nguyễn Võ Hữu Vinh (VIE)	EL

=== Semifinals ===
- Qualification: First in each heat (Q) and the next 6 fastest (q) advance to the final.

==== Heat 1 ====
Rank	Athlete	Time	Notes
1	Jung Cheol-won (KOR)	1:25.809	Q
2	Huang Yu-lin (TPE)	1:25.896	q
3	Chao Tsu-cheng (TPE)	1:25.962	q
4	Mohammad Amin Heidari (IRI)	1:27.326	q
5	Katsuki Kato (JPN)	1:27.336	
6	Kiarash Shamohammadi (IRI)	1:30.152	
7	Nguyễn Võ Hữu Vinh (VIE)	DNF	
8	Ryan Chua (SGP)	DNF	

==== Heat 2 ====
Rank	Athlete	Time	Notes
1	Choi Gwang-ho (KOR)	1:25.355	Q
2	Zhang Zhenhai (CHN)	1:25.439	q
3	Vikram Ingale (IND)	1:26.100	q
4	Aryanpal Singh (IND)	1:26.222	q
5	Pawarit Nochai (THA)	1:30.089	
6	Noppron Choochorngamket (THA)	1:30.328	
7	Lucas Ng (SGP)	1:31.895	
8	Nguyễn Nhựt Linh (VIE)	1:42.377	

=== Final ===
Rank	Athlete	Time
1st place, gold medalist(s)	Choi Gwang-ho (KOR)	1:29.497
2nd place, silver medalist(s)	Jung Cheol-won (KOR)	1:29.499
3rd place, bronze medalist(s)	Chao Tsu-cheng (TPE)	1:29.527
4	Vikram Ingale (IND)	1:29.952
5	Zhang Zhenhai (CHN)	1:30.117
6	Mohammad Amin Heidari (IRI)	1:30.443
7	Aryanpal Singh (IND)	1:30.466
—	Huang Yu-lin (TPE)	DSQ–SF
