= Roller speed skating at the 2022 Asian Games – Women's 10000 metres points elimination =

Women's 10000 metres points elimination at the 2022 Asian Games
- Venue: Qiantang Roller Sports Centre
- Date: 30 September 2023
- Competitors: 11 from 6 nations

Medalists
gold medal	Shih Pei-yu	Chinese Taipei
silver medal	Yang Ho-chen	Chinese Taipei
bronze medal	Yu Ga-ram	South Korea

The Women's 10000 metres points elimination event at the 2022 Asian Games was held in Qiantang Roller Sports Centre, Hangzhou on 30 September 2023.

== Schedule ==
All times are China Standard Time (UTC+08:00)

Date	Time	Event
Saturday, 30 September 2023	09:00	Final

== Results ==
- EL — Eliminated

Rank	Athlete	Time	Score
1st place, gold medalist(s)	Shih Pei-yu (TPE)	17:23.219	21
2nd place, silver medalist(s)	Yang Ho-chen (TPE)	17:23.879	18
3rd place, bronze medalist(s)	Yu Ga-ram (KOR)	17:23.416	14
4	Lee Seul (KOR)	17:33.083	10
5	Aarathy Kasturi Raj (IND)	17:41.159	3
6	Vanessa Wong (HKG)	EL	
7	Heeral Sadhu (IND)	EL	
8	Nahal Moghaddam (IRI)	EL	
9	Mahshid Kiaei (IRI)	EL	
10	Arnatcha Mukdasawat (THA)	EL	
11	Irada Lim (THA)	EL	
