= Skateboarding at the 2019 SEA Games =

Skateboarding at the 2019 Southeast Asian Games
- Venue: Tagaytay Extreme Sports Complex, Tagaytay, Cavite; Tagaytay International Convention Center Sigtuna Hall, Tagaytay, Cavite; Seaside Race Track, Maragondon, Cavite
- Dates: 3–8 December
- Nations: 7

Skateboarding at the 2019 Southeast Asian Games was held in Tagaytay, Philippines from 3 to 8 December 2019. This edition marks the first time that skateboarding was contested in the regional games due to the sport making its debut at the 2020 Tokyo Olympics.

== Schedule ==
P	Preliminary	F	Final

Event↓/Date →	Tue 3	Wed 4	Thu 5	Fri 6	Sat 7	Sun 8
Men's park				P		F
Men's street			P		F	
Men's game of skate	P	F				
Men's downhill			P	F		
Women's park				P		F
Women's street			P		F	
Women's game of skate	P	F				
Women's downhill			P	F		

Source: 2019 Sea Games

== Participation ==
Seven nations will participate in skateboarding events of the 2019 Southeast Asian Games.

- Indonesia
- Malaysia
- Myanmar
- Philippines
- Singapore
- Thailand
- Vietnam

As host the Philippines can send two athletes per event. An athlete representing any nation can only participate in at most two events.

== Medal summary ==
=== Men ===
Event	Gold	Silver	Bronze
Street	Sanggoe Darma Tanjung; Indonesia	Renzo Mark Feliciano; Philippines	Sothicai Ruksumruach; Thailand
Park	Kiko Francisco; Philippines	Jason Dennis Lijnzaat; Indonesia	Brian Van Upapong; Thailand
Game of skate	Daniel Ledermann; Philippines	Basral Graito Hutomo; Indonesia	Thawatchai Siangoueng; Thailand
Downhill	Jaime de Lange; Philippines	Duke Pandeagua; Philippines	Luqman Hakimi Ahmad Shahrafidz; Malaysia

=== Women ===
Event	Gold	Silver	Bronze
Street	Margielyn Didal; Philippines	Christiana Nicole Means; Philippines	Kyandra Kaelani Susanto; Indonesia
Park	Christiana Nicole Means; Philippines	Bunga Nyimas Cinta; Indonesia	Neepa Arumdapta Pramesti; Indonesia
Game of skate	Margielyn Didal; Philippines	Christiana Nicole Means; Philippines	Bunga Nyimas Cinta; Indonesia
Downhill	Grace Wong; Malaysia	Nuansamorn Pimchua; Thailand	Rydelle Abarico; Philippines

== Medal table ==
* Host nation (Philippines)

Rank	Nation	Gold	Silver	Bronze	Total
1	Philippines*	6	4	1	11
2	Indonesia	1	3	3	7
3	Malaysia	1	0	1	2
4	Thailand	0	1	3	4
Totals (4 entries)		8	8	8	24
