= Roller speed skating at the 2022 Asian Games – Women's 1000 metres sprint =

Women's 1000 metres sprint at the 2022 Asian Games
- Venue: Qiantang Roller Sports Centre
- Date: 1 October 2023
- Competitors: 11 from 6 nations

Medalists
gold medal	Li Meng-chu	Chinese Taipei
silver medal	Liu Yi-hsuan	Chinese Taipei
bronze medal	Lee Ye-rim	South Korea

The women's 1000 metres sprint event at the 2022 Asian Games was held in Qiantang Roller Sports Centre, Hangzhou on 1 October 2023.

== Schedule ==
All times are China Standard Time (UTC+08:00)

Date	Time	Event
Sunday, 1 October 2023	09:00	Heats
Sunday, 1 October 2023	09:45	Semifinals
Sunday, 1 October 2023	10:40	Final

== Results ==
=== Heats ===
- Qualification: 16 fastest advance to the semifinals.

Rank	Heat	Athlete	Time
1	1	Liu Yi-hsuan (TPE)	1:31.430
2	1	Lee Ye-rim (KOR)	1:31.637
3	1	Vanessa Wong (HKG)	1:37.065
4	1	Melika Manouchehrirad (IRI)	1:37.217
5	1	Negin Sheikhi (IRI)	1:38.414
6	1	Arnatcha Mukdasawat (THA)	1:40.713
7	2	Li Meng-chu (TPE)	1:44.474
8	2	Park Min-jeong (KOR)	1:44.832
9	2	Karthika Jagadeeswaran (IND)	1:44.957
10	2	Pentipphart Chavana (THA)	1:45.119
11	2	Sanjana Bathula (IND)	1:45.435

=== Semifinals ===
- Qualification: First in each heat (Q) and the next 6 fastest (q) advance to the final.

==== Heat 1 ====
Rank	Athlete	Time	Notes
1	Liu Yi-hsuan (TPE)	1:31.117	Q
2	Park Min-jeong (KOR)	1:35.785	q
3	Karthika Jagadeeswaran (IND)	1:36.860	q
4	Negin Sheikhi (IRI)	1:37.082	q
5	Melika Manouchehrirad (IRI)	1:37.157	q

==== Heat 2 ====
Rank	Athlete	Time	Notes
1	Li Meng-chu (TPE)	1:38.491	Q
2	Lee Ye-rim (KOR)	1:38.573	q
3	Vanessa Wong (HKG)	1:39.151	q
4	Pentipphart Chavana (THA)	1:39.208	
5	Arnatcha Mukdasawat (THA)	1:41.601	
6	Sanjana Bathula (IND)	1:42.681	

=== Final ===
Rank	Athlete	Time
1st place, gold medalist(s)	Li Meng-chu (TPE)	1:38.518
2nd place, silver medalist(s)	Liu Yi-hsuan (TPE)	1:38.712
3rd place, bronze medalist(s)	Lee Ye-rim (KOR)	1:38.750
4	Park Min-jeong (KOR)	1:38.780
5	Karthika Jagadeeswaran (IND)	1:40.395
6	Vanessa Wong (HKG)	1:41.075
7	Melika Manouchehrirad (IRI)	1:42.701
8	Negin Sheikhi (IRI)	1:43.869
