= Speed skating at the 2023 Central American and Caribbean Games =

Roller sports at the 2023 Central American and Caribbean Games
- Venue: Patinódromo El Polvorín
- Location: (El Salvador) San Salvador
- Dates: 23–26 June

The Inline speed skating competition at the 2023 Central American and Caribbean Games was held at Patinódromo El Polvorín in San Salvador, El Salvador from 23 to 26 June.

== Medal table ==
* Host nation (El Salvador)

Rank	Nation	Gold	Silver	Bronze	Total
1	Colombia (COL)	13	2	1	16
2	Centro Caribe Sports (CCS)	1	2	0	3
3	Venezuela (VEN)	0	5	3	8
4	Mexico (MEX)	0	3	5	8
5	El Salvador (ESA)*	0	1	5	6
6	Cuba (CUB)	0	1	0	1
Totals (6 entries)		14	14	14	42

== Medal summary ==
=== Men's events ===
Event	Gold	Silver	Bronze
100m Sprint	Faberson Bonilla (CCS)	Jorge Martinez (MEX)	Marvin Rodriguez (ESA)
1 Lap Sprint	Andrés Jiménez (COL)	Faberson Bonilla (CCS)	Jorge Martinez (MEX)
200m Time Trial	Andrés Jiménez (COL)	Faberson Bonilla (CCS)	Jorge Martinez (MEX)
500m + Distance	Andrés Jiménez (COL)	Jose Rojas (VEN)	Marvin Rodriguez (ESA)
1000m Sprint	Andrés Jiménez (COL)	Jose Rojas (VEN)	Jorge Escobar (COL)
10000m Elimination	Jorge Escobar (COL)	Gustavo Rodriguez (VEN)	Mike Paez (MEX)
10000m Points Elimination	Jorge Escobar (COL)	Andrés Jiménez (COL)	Mike Paez (MEX)

=== Women's events ===
Event	Gold	Silver	Bronze
100m Sprint	Geiny Pájaro (COL)	Adriana Cantillo (CUB)	Ivonne Nóchez (ESA)
1 Lap Sprint	Geiny Pájaro (COL)	Nelly Fernandez (VEN)	Ivonne Nóchez (ESA)
200m Time Trial	Geiny Pájaro (COL)	Ivonne Nóchez (ESA)	Mariela Casillas (MEX)
500m + Distance	Geiny Pájaro (COL)	Nelly Fernandez (VEN)	Ivonne Nóchez (ESA)
1000m Sprint	Fabriana Arias (COL)	Geiny Pájaro (COL)	Angy Quintero (VEN)
10000m Elimination	Fabriana Arias (COL)	Valentina Letelier (MEX)	Angy Quintero (VEN)
10000m Points Elimination	Fabriana Arias (COL)	Valentina Letelier (MEX)	Angy Quintero (VEN)
