= 2025 Inline Speed Skating World Championships =

Speed skating competition

2025 World Championships
- Location: Beidaihe, China
- Dates: 13–21 September

Champions
- Men: Colombia
- Women: Colombia

The 2025 Inline Speed Skating World Championships was the 73rd edition of the Inline Speed Skating World Championships overall and was held in Beidaihe (for the track and road events) in China from 13 to 21 September 2025.

== Medal summary ==
=== Senior ===
==== Men ====
Event	Gold	Silver	Bronze
Track
200m Dual Time Trial	Kuo Li-yang; Chinese Taipei	Jhoan Guzmán; Spain	Vincenzo Maiorca; Italy
500m Sprint	Jhoan Guzmán; Spain	Jhon Tascon; Colombia	Anandkumar Velkumar; India
1000m Sprint	Anandkumar Velkumar; India	Duccio Marsili; Italy	Julio Mirena; Paraguay
5000m points	Raúl Pedraza; Chile	Hugo Morin; France	Chao Tsu-cheng; Chinese Taipei
10000m elimination	Juan Mantilla; Colombia	Chao Tsu-cheng; Chinese Taipei	Raúl Pedraza; Chile
3000m relay	Italy; Duccio Marsili; Vincenzo Maiorca; Daniel Niero; Giuseppe Bramante	Colombia; Jhon Tascon; Juan Mantilla; Nicolás Barrios; Jorge Escobar	France; Martin Ferrié; Yvan Sivilier; Doucelin Pedicone; Hugo Morin
Road
100m Sprint	Jhoan Guzmán; Spain	Vincenzo Maiorca; Italy	Ron Pucklitzsch; Germany
1 Lap Sprint	Jhon Tascon; Colombia	Simon Albrecht; Germany	Jhoan Guzmán; Spain
10000m points	Juan Mantilla; Colombia	Julio Mirena; Paraguay	Francisco Peula; Spain
15000m elimination	Kevin Lenis; Colombia	Chao Tsu-cheng; Chinese Taipei	Giuseppe Bramante; Italy
42195m Marathon	Anandkumar Velkumar; India	Kevin Lenis; Colombia	Juan Mantilla; Colombia

==== Women ====
Event	Gold	Silver	Bronze
Track
200m Dual Time	Kollin Castro; Colombia	Geiny Pájaro; Colombia	Loubna Benkanoun; France
500m Sprint	María Fernanda Timms; Colombia	Kollin Castro; Colombia	Alice Sorcionovo; Italy
1000m Sprint	Kollin Castro; Colombia	María Fernanda Timms; Colombia	Shih Pei-yu; Chinese Taipei
5000m points	Fernanda Moncada; Ecuador	Luz Garzón; Colombia	Guo Dan; China
10000m elimination	Gabriela Rueda; Colombia	Luz Garzón; Colombia	Marine Lefeuvre; France
3000m relay	Colombia; Gabriela Rueda; María Fernanda Timms; Kollin Castro; Luz Garzón	Chinese Taipei; Lin Xin-yu; Shih Pei-yu; Liu Yi-hsuan; Li Meng-chu	France; Marie Dupuy; Alison Bernardi; Manon Fraboulet; Marine Lefeuvre
Road
100m Sprint	Geiny Pájaro; Colombia	Haila Brunet; France	Kollin Castro; Colombia
1 Lap Sprint	Angely Vanessa; Colombia	Liu Yi-hsuan; Chinese Taipei	Loubna Benkanoun; France
10000m points	Marine Lefeuvre; France	Larissa Gaiser; Germany	Guo Dan; China
15000m elimination	Luz Garzón; Colombia	Yicel Giraldo; Colombia	Alison Bernardi; France
42195m Marathon	Liu Yi-hsuan; Chinese Taipei	Shih Pei-yu; Chinese Taipei	Li Meng-chu; Chinese Taipei

=== Junior ===
==== Men ====
Event	Gold	Silver	Bronze
Track
200m Dual Time Trial	Jichan Kim; South Korea	Li Yu-chen; Chinese Taipei	Cristian Scassellati; Italy
500m Sprint	Cristian Scassellati; Italy	Jichan Kim; South Korea	Wilmar Charris; Colombia
1000m Sprint	Krish Sharma; India	Lu Dengbo; China	Gabriel Reyes; Chile
5000m points	Joaquín Loyola; Ecuador	Gabriel Reyes; Chile	Diego Molina; Colombia
10000m elimination	Byungho Kang; South Korea	Joaquín Loyola; Ecuador	Julian Pinilla; Colombia
3000m relay	Chile; Gabriel Reyes; Guillermo Castillo; Eric Gauna	China; Linxin Hu; Jiahao Yang; Lu Dengbo; Wenxi Zhang	Colombia; Wilcar Aguilar; Wilmar Charris; Diego Molina; Julian Pinilla
Road
100m Sprint	Cristian Scassellati; Italy	Stan Beelen; Belgium	Amirmahdi Yahaghi; Iran
1 Lap Sprint	Wilcar Aguilar; Colombia	Maurice Marosi; Germany	Anish Raj; India
10000m points	Joaquín Loyola; Ecuador	Giorgio Ghisio; Italy	Gioele Citterio; Italy
15000m elimination	Gabriel Reyes; Chile	Rommel Velásquez; Colombia	Giorgio Ghisio; Italy

==== Women ====
Event	Gold	Silver	Bronze
Track
200m Dual Time Trial	Sofia Chiumiento; Italy	Gisell Caicedo; Colombia	Dairy Londoño; Colombia
500m Sprint	Sofia Chiumiento; Italy	María Maldonado; Colombia	Gisell Caicedo; Colombia
1000m Sprint	Manuela Saldarriaga; Colombia	Dairy Londoño; Colombia	Lyssa Vansteenkiste; Belgium
5000m points	Mariana Imitola; Colombia	Sejin Kwon; South Korea	Yu Fei Li; China
10000m elimination	Manuela Rodríguez; Colombia	Mariana Imitola; Colombia	Maiwenn Julou; France
3000m relay	Colombia; Manuela Saldarriaga; Manuela Rodríguez; Dairy Londoño; Gisell Caicedo	Italy; Asia Negri; Martina Castorina; Sofia Chiumiento; Rita De Gianni	Chinese Taipei; Chen Sin-yu; Yan Wan-xin; Hsia Tzu-han; Tsai Chia-yu
Road
100m Sprint	Sofia Chiumiento; Italy	Asia Negri; Italy	Yicen Zhuo; China
1 Lap Sprint	María Maldonado; Colombia	Gisell Caicedo; Colombia	Sofia Chiumiento; Italy
10000m points	Angie Loaiza; Colombia	Mariana Imitola; Colombia	Maiwenn Julou; France
15000m elimination	Sarah Portela; Colombia	Maiwenn Julou; France	Su Jhih-lin; Chinese Taipei

== Medal table ==
=== Senior ===
* Host nation (China)

Rank	Nation	Gold	Silver	Bronze	Total
1	Colombia	12	9	2	23
2	Chinese Taipei	2	5	3	10
3	Spain	2	1	2	5
4	India	2	0	1	3
5	France	1	2	6	9
6	Italy	1	2	3	6
7	Chile	1	0	1	2
8	Ecuador	1	0	0	1
9	Germany	0	2	1	3
10	Paraguay	0	1	1	2
11	China*	0	0	2	2
Totals (11 entries)		22	22	22	66

=== Junior ===
* Host nation (China)

Rank	Nation	Gold	Silver	Bronze	Total
1	Colombia	8	7	6	21
2	Italy	5	3	4	12
3	South Korea	2	2	0	4
4	Chile	2	1	1	4
5	Ecuador	2	1	0	3
6	India	1	0	1	2
7	China*	0	2	2	4
8	Chinese Taipei	0	1	2	3
8	France	0	1	2	3
10	Belgium	0	1	1	2
11	Germany	0	1	0	1
12	Iran	0	0	1	1
Totals (12 entries)		20	20	20	60

=== Overall ===
* Host nation (China)

Rank	Nation	Gold	Silver	Bronze	Total
1	Colombia	20	16	8	44
2	Italy	6	5	7	18
3	Chile	3	1	2	6
4	Ecuador	3	1	0	4
5	India	3	0	2	5
6	Chinese Taipei	2	6	5	13
7	South Korea	2	2	0	4
8	Spain	2	1	2	5
9	France	1	3	8	12
10	Germany	0	3	1	4
11	China*	0	2	4	6
12	Belgium	0	1	1	2
12	Paraguay	0	1	1	2
14	Iran	0	0	1	1
Totals (14 entries)		42	42	42	126
