= Tagaytay City Sports Complex =

Complex of sports facilities in Tagaytay, Philippines

- Tagaytay Extreme Sports Complex
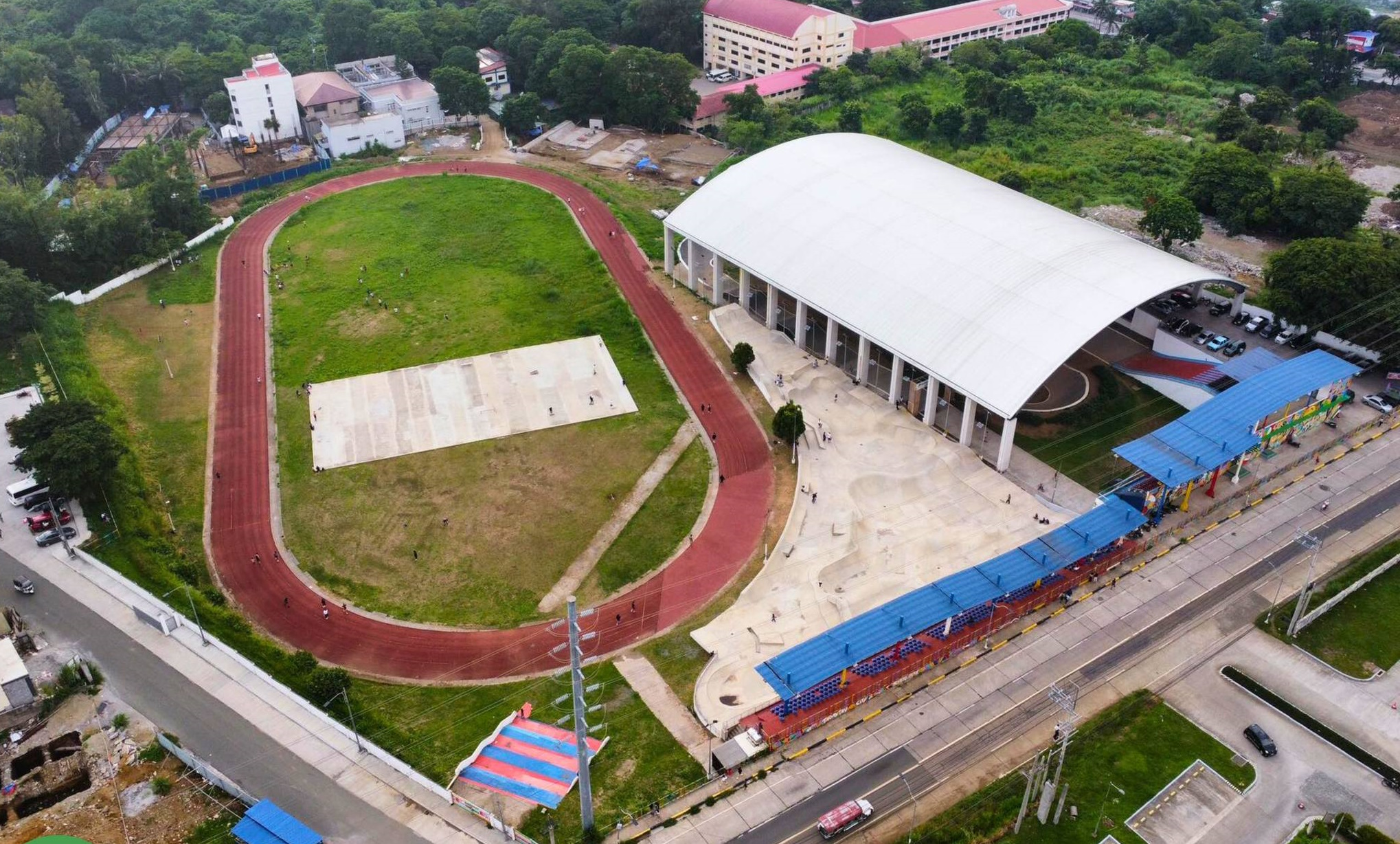
- From left to right: athletic oval, skate park, and BMX park (roofed)
- Interactive map of Tagaytay City Sports Complex
- Address: Crisanto Mendoza de los Reyes Avenue; Tagaytay; Philippines
- Coordinates: 14°05′57.8″N 120°56′23.0″E
- Facilities: Track oval, BMX park, skate park, combat center

Construction
- Expanded: 2019, 2023
- Main contractors: WRC Construction (skate and BMX parks)

The Tagaytay City Sports Complex is a complex of sports facilities in Tagaytay, Philippines.

== History ==
In 2019, for the 2019 Southeast Asian Games, new facilities were implemented within the sports complex. The project was built by the Department of Public Works and Highways (DWPH) and the Tagaytay city government with WRC Construction as the private contractor. The DWPH has included its skatepark as part of President Rodrigo Duterte's Build! Build! Build! infrastructure program. It was completed on December 17, 2019, with construction taking three months to finish. The sports venue was able to host the cycling and skateboarding events of the 2019 Southeast Asian Games.

The sports venue was closed in early 2020 due to community quarantine measures imposed in response to the COVID-19 pandemic. It was briefly opened to the public in September 2020 but was closed again. By September 2021, the skatepark's street section has become dilapidated.

The multi-purpose arena was refurbished and re-inaugurated as the Tagaytay Combat Sports Center on July 27, 2023. An indoor velodrome is also being built.

== Facilities ==
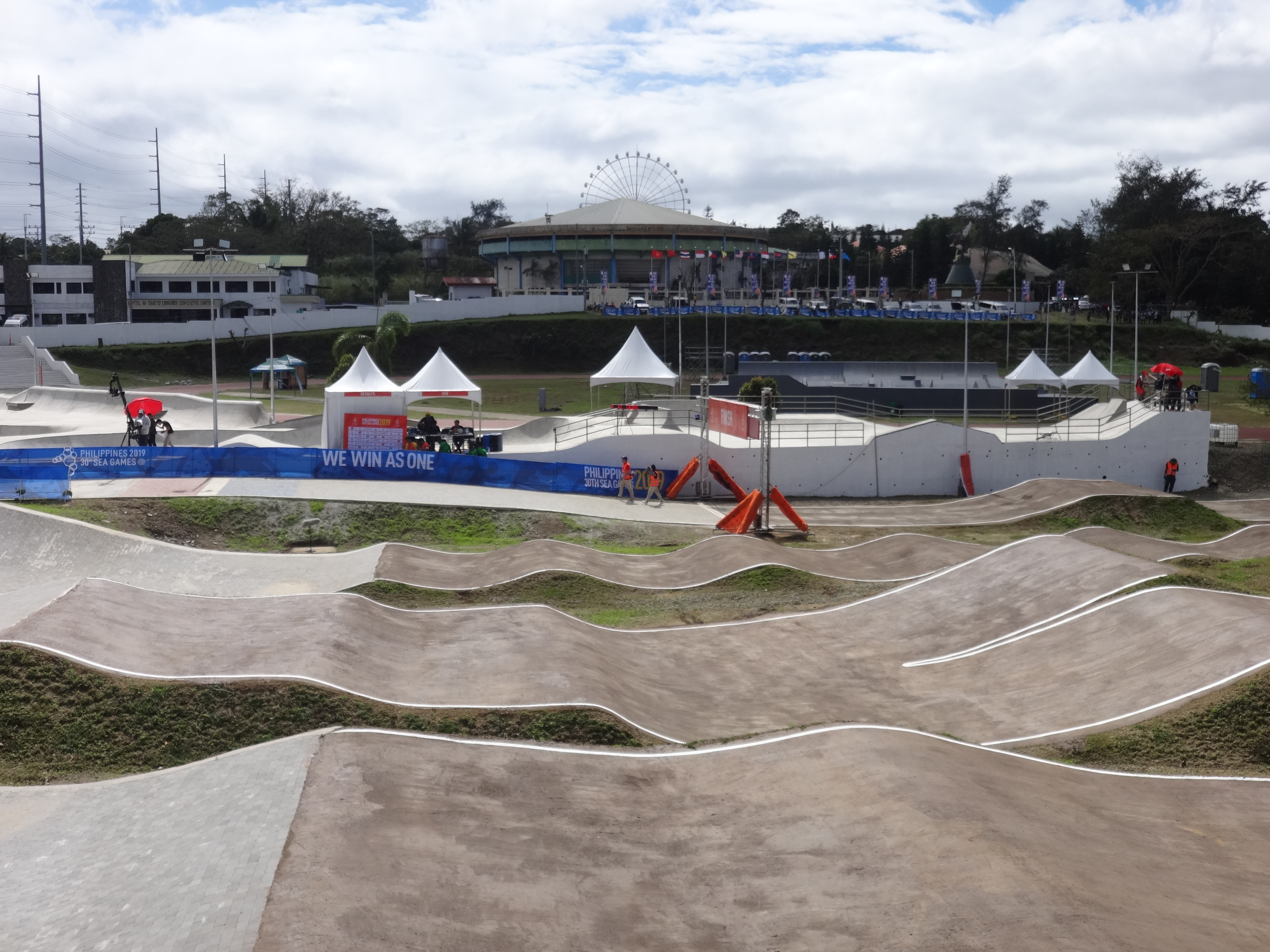
The skate park (background) and BMX tracks (foreground) at the sports complex

The sports complex has a track oval, a BMX trail and a skatepark. The skate park has two main sections, the street section built at the center of the oval and the bowl which was built beside the BMX trail.

Facility	Purpose	Year completed
Tagaytay Track Oval	Athletics	—
Tagaytay Skate Park	Skateboarding	2019
Tagaytay BMX Park	BMX	2019
Tagaytay Combat Sports Center	Martial arts	2023
Tagaytay City Velodrome	Cycling	2025
