= Roller Sports at the 2017 Summer Universiade – Men's 3000 metres relay =

Men's 3000 metres relay at the XXIX Summer Universiade
- Venues: Yingfeng Riverside Park Roller Sports Rink (A)
- Dates: 23 August
- Competitors: 33 from 9 nations

Medalists
1st place, gold medalist(s)		Chen Yan-cheng; Huang Yu-lin; Kao Mao-chieh; Sung Ching-yang	Chinese Taipei
2nd place, silver medalist(s)		Choi Gwang-ho; Jeong Byeong-kwan; Kim Jin-young; Lee Sang-cheol	South Korea
3rd place, bronze medalist(s)		Carlos Esteban Perez Canaval; Carlos Ivan Franco Perez; Cesar Enrique Nunez Almanze; Johan Sebastian Cabrera Orjuela	Colombia

The men's 3000 metres relay event at the 2017 Summer Universiade was held on 23 August at the Yingfeng Riverside Park Roller Sports Rink (A).

== Results ==
=== Preliminary Round ===
Rank	Heat	Team	Time	Results
1	1	South Korea (KOR)	4:06.609	Q
2	1	Colombia (COL)	4:06.653	Q
3	1	Japan (JPN)	4:08.198	Q
4	1	Austria (AUT)	4:08.272	
5	2	Chinese Taipei (TPE)	4:12.101	Q
6	2	Germany (GER)	4:12.197	Q
7	2	Italy (ITA)	4:12.929	Q
8	2	Czech Republic (CZE)	4:17.666	
	2	Russia (RUS)	DSQ	

=== Finals ===
Rank	Team	Results
1st place, gold medalist(s)	Chinese Taipei (TPE)	4:04.432
2nd place, silver medalist(s)	South Korea (KOR)	4:04.447
3rd place, bronze medalist(s)	Colombia (COL)	4:04.512
4	Germany (GER)	4:05.199
5	Italy (ITA)	4:06.278
6	Japan (JPN)	4:06.352
