= Artistic roller skating at the 2010 Asian Games – Women's free skating =

Women's free skating at the 2010 Asian Games
- Venue: Guangzhou Velodrome
- Date: 25–26 November 2010
- Competitors: 8 from 4 nations

Medalists
| gold medal | Wang Hsiao-chu | Chinese Taipei |
| silver medal | Dong Zhidou | China |
| bronze medal | Lin Meijiao | China |

The women's artistic single free skating event at the 2010 Asian Games was held in Guangzhou Velodrome, Guangzhou on 25 November and 26 November.

== Schedule ==
All times are China Standard Time (UTC+08:00)

| Date | Time | Event |
|---|---|---|
| Thursday, 25 November 2010 | 14:00 | Short program |
| Friday, 26 November 2010 | 13:30 | Long program |

== Results ==
| Rank | Athlete | SP | LP | Total |
|---|---|---|---|---|
| 1st place, gold medalist(s) | Wang Hsiao-chu (TPE) | 79.6 | 247.2 | 326.8 |
| 2nd place, silver medalist(s) | Dong Zhidou (CHN) | 76.9 | 245.1 | 322.0 |
| 3rd place, bronze medalist(s) | Lin Meijiao (CHN) | 75.7 | 229.2 | 304.9 |
| 4 | Li Wan-ning (TPE) | 74.9 | 219.0 | 293.9 |
| 5 | Aashna Rajan Shah (IND) | 67.1 | 210.6 | 277.7 |
| 6 | Avani Panchal (IND) | 66.6 | 207.3 | 273.9 |
| 7 | Kim Hye-won (KOR) | 55.8 | 169.5 | 225.3 |
| 8 | Back Na-young (KOR) | 50.8 | 173.4 | 224.2 |
