= Sanggoe Darma Tanjung =

Indonesian skateboarder

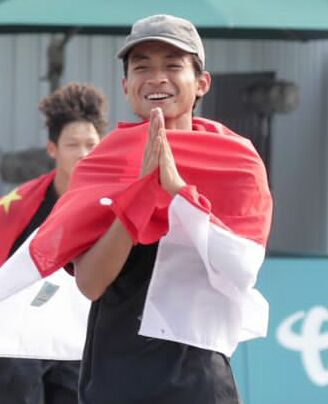
- Sanggoe Darma at Asian Games 2022 Hangzhou

Personal information
- Nationality: Indonesian
- Born: Sanggoe Darma Tanjung; 28 December 2001 (age 24) Batam, Indonesia
- Occupation: Professional skateboarder
- Height: 168 cm (5 ft 6 in)

Sport
- Country: Indonesia
- Sport: Skateboarding
- Event: Street
- Turned pro: 2015
Medal record
Men's street skateboarding
Representing Indonesia
Asian Games
Silver medal – second place	2018 Jakarta-Palembang	Street
Silver medal – second place	2022 Hangzhou	Street
ISF Asian Championships
Silver medal – second place	2016 Shanghai	Street
SEA Games
Gold medal – first place	2019 Philippines	Street

Sanggoe Darma Tanjung (born 28 December 2001) is an Indonesian street skateboarder and a two-time silver medalist at the Asian Games. At the 2022 Asian Games, he finished second in the Men's street skateboarding event.

== Career ==
Sanggoe has known skateboarding since the age of five, has participated in several skateboarding festivals. He made his professional skateboarding debut in 2015 at Festival International des Sports Extremes World in Malaysia, where he placed second in of the men's street event.

He placed runner-up at the 2018 Asian Games when he at sixteen and won the SEA Games in 2019.

He take a silver in 2016 Asian Skateboard Championship (International Skateboard Association). He also competed in World Skateboarding Grand Prix and World Skateboarding Championship.
