= Artistic roller skating at the 2010 Asian Games – Men's free skating =

Men's free skating at the 2010 Asian Games
- Venue: Guangzhou Velodrome
- Date: 25–26 November 2010
- Competitors: 8 from 5 nations

Medalists
gold medal	Shingo Nishiki	Japan
silver medal	Yeh Chia-chen	Chinese Taipei
bronze medal	Anup Kumar Yama	India

The men's artistic single free skating event at the 2010 Asian Games was held in Guangzhou Velodrome, Guangzhou, China on 25 November and 26 November.

== Schedule ==
All times are China Standard Time (UTC+08:00)

Date	Time	Event
Thursday, 25 November 2010	14:50	Short program
Friday, 26 November 2010	14:40	Long program

== Results ==
Rank	Athlete	SP	LP	Total
1st place, gold medalist(s)	Shingo Nishiki (JPN)	84.9	253.8	338.7
2nd place, silver medalist(s)	Yeh Chia-chen (TPE)	81.9	248.4	330.3
3rd place, bronze medalist(s)	Anup Kumar Yama (IND)	81.6	244.2	325.8
4	Zhao Zilong (CHN)	79.0	243.6	322.6
5	Ming Chieh (TPE)	78.1	236.4	314.5
6	Deng Lei (CHN)	77.9	222.6	300.5
7	Akhil Chitikela (IND)	74.1	222.0	296.1
8	Jung Jae-han (KOR)	61.2	182.4	243.6
