= Siddhant Kamble =

Indian speed skater (born 1999)

Personal information
- Full name: Siddhant Rahul Kamble
- Nationality: Indian
- Born: 27 June 1999 (age 27)
- Height: 1.77 m (5 ft 10 in)

Sport
- Sport: Roller sports
- Event: Inline speed skating
Medal record
Men's inline speed skating
Representing India
Asian Games
Bronze medal – third place	2022 Hangzhou	3000m team relay

Siddhant Rahul Kamble (born 27 June 1999) is an Indian speed skating track athlete from Pune. He was in the Indian speed skating team for the 2022 Asian Games in Hangzhou, China. He was part of the relay team that won the bronze medal in the men's 3000m event along with Vikram Ingale, Aryanpal Singh and Anandkumar Velkumar.

== Early life ==
Siddhant hails from Pune. His father Rahul Kamble is electric contractor and his mother is a homemaker. He started skating at the age of six at his school Bharatiya Vidya Bhavan Paranjape Vidyamandir school under coaches Amit Gole and Sameer Gole. From 2019, he trained under the Indian coach Sripad Shinde.

== Career ==
He won two silver medals in the Asian Championships 2023 in the individual 10,000 metre races.
