= 2022 Inline Speed Skating World Championships =

Inline Speed Skating competition

2022 World Championships
- Location: Vicente López / Buenos Aires, Argentina
- Dates: 29 October – 3 November

Champions
- Men: France
- Women: Colombia

The 2022 Inline Speed Skating World Championships was the 70th edition of the Inline Speed Skating World Championships overall and was held in Vicente López (for the track events) and Buenos Aires (for the road events) in Argentina from 29 October to 2 November 2022. It was held as part of the 2022 World Skate Games in Argentina. It was the 8th edition of the championship to take place in Argentina and first to take place in Buenos Aires or Vicente López.

== Medal summary ==
=== Men ===
Event	Gold	Silver	Bronze
Track
200m Dual Time Trial	Jhoan Guzmán; Spain	Steven Villegas; Colombia	Elton De Souza; France
500m Sprint	Andrés Jiménez; Colombia	Duccio Marsili; Italy	Yvan Sivilier; France
1000m Sprint	Chao Tsu-cheng; Chinese Taipei	Duccio Marsili; Italy	Ken Kuwada; Argentina
10000m points elimination	Martin Ferrié; France	Francisco Peula; Spain	Jason Suttels; Belgium
10000m elimination	Martin Ferrié; France	Jorge Bolaños; Ecuador	Doucelin Pedicone; France
3000m relay	Argentina; Argentina	Chinese Taipei; Chinese Taipei	Colombia; Colombia
Road
100m Sprint	Jhoan Guzmán; Spain	Alessio Piergigli; Italy	Jorge Martínez; Mexico
1 Lap Sprint	Jhoan Guzmán; Spain	Yvan Sivilier; France	Duccio Marsili; Italy
10000m points	Jason Suttels; Belgium	Juan Mantilla; Colombia	Raúl Pedraza; Chile
15000m elimination	Nolan Beddiaf; France	Juan Mantilla; Colombia	Andrés Gómez; Colombia
42195m Marathon	Nolan Beddiaf; France	Jorge Bolaños; Ecuador	Manuel Taibo; Spain

=== Women ===
Event	Gold	Silver	Bronze
Track
200m Dual Time Trial	Sheila Muñoz; Colombia	Asja Varani; Italy	Kerstinck Sarmiento; Colombia
500m Sprint	Liu Yi-hsuan; Chinese Taipei	Erin Jackson; United States	María Fernanda Timms; Colombia
1000m Sprint	Li Meng-chu; Chinese Taipei	Angy Quintero; Venezuela	Liu Yi-hsuan; Chinese Taipei
10000m points elimination	Fabriana Arias; Colombia	Gabriela Rueda; Colombia	Gabriela Vargas; Ecuador
10000m elimination	Gabriela Rueda; Colombia	Luz Garzón; Colombia	Marine Lefeuvre; France
3000m relay	Colombia; Colombia	Chinese Taipei; Chinese Taipei	South Korea; South Korea
Road
100m Sprint	Kerstinck Sarmiento; Colombia	Sheila Muñoz; Colombia	Erin Jackson; United States
1 Lap Sprint	Erin Jackson; United States	Kollin Castro; Colombia	Luisa González; Spain
10000m points	Gabriela Rueda; Colombia	Chang Yu-hsin; Chinese Taipei	Fabriana Arias; Colombia
15000m elimination	Luz Garzón; Colombia	Gabriela Rueda; Colombia	Gabriela Vargas; Ecuador
42195m Marathon	Luz Garzón; Colombia	Gabriela Vargas; Ecuador	Fran Vanhoutte; Belgium

== Medal table ==
* Host nation (Argentina)

Rank	Nation	Gold	Silver	Bronze	Total
1	Colombia	9	8	5	22
2	France	4	1	4	9
3	Chinese Taipei	3	3	1	7
4	Spain	3	1	2	6
5	United States	1	1	1	3
6	Belgium	1	0	2	3
7	Argentina*	1	0	1	2
8	Italy	0	4	1	5
9	Ecuador	0	3	2	5
10	Venezuela	0	1	0	1
11	Chile	0	0	1	1
11	Mexico	0	0	1	1
11	South Korea	0	0	1	1
Totals (13 entries)		22	22	22	66
