= Roller speed skating at the 2010 Asian Games – Women's 10000 metres points elimination =

Women's 10000 metres points elimination at the 2010 Asian Games
- Venue: Guangzhou Velodrome
- Date: 24 November 2010
- Competitors: 10 from 6 nations

Medalists
gold medal	Woo Hyo-sook	South Korea
silver medal	Guo Dan	China
bronze medal	Pan Yi-chin	Chinese Taipei

The women's 10000 metres points and elimination event at the 2010 Asian Games was held in Guangzhou Velodrome, Guangzhou on 24 November.

== Schedule ==
All times are China Standard Time (UTC+08:00)

Date	Time	Event
Wednesday, 24 November 2010	09:00	Final

== Results ==
- EL — Eliminated

Rank	Athlete	Time	Score
1st place, gold medalist(s)	Woo Hyo-sook (KOR)	16:36.619	31
2nd place, silver medalist(s)	Guo Dan (CHN)	16:37.086	20
3rd place, bronze medalist(s)	Pan Yi-chin (TPE)	16:36.837	17
4	Fan Chih-ling (TPE)	16:37.121	5
5	Nachi Shinozuka (JPN)	16:37.621	3
6	Li Lisha (CHN)	16:39.472	0
7	Lee Ji-hyeon (KOR)	EL	
8	Niloufar Mardani (IRI)	EL	
9	Kanika Bhalla (IND)	EL	
10	Pragna Anand (IND)	EL	
