= Roller speed skating at the 2010 Asian Games – Men's 10000 metres points elimination =

Men's 10000 metres points elimination at the 2010 Asian Games
- Venue: Guangzhou Velodrome
- Date: 24 November 2010
- Competitors: 11 from 6 nations

Medalists
gold medal	Son Geun-seong	South Korea
silver medal	Choi Gwang-ho	South Korea
bronze medal	Cong Siyuan	China

The Men's 10000 metres points and elimination event at the 2010 Asian Games was held in Guangzhou Velodrome, Guangzhou on 24 November.

== Schedule ==
All times are China Standard Time (UTC+08:00)

Date	Time	Event
Wednesday, 24 November 2010	09:35	Final

== Results ==
- EL — Eliminated

Rank	Athlete	Time	Score
1st place, gold medalist(s)	Son Geun-seong (KOR)	15:49.613	26
2nd place, silver medalist(s)	Choi Gwang-ho (KOR)	15:49.574	25
3rd place, bronze medalist(s)	Cong Siyuan (CHN)	15:53.671	15
4	Chang Chia-hao (TPE)	16:27.228	6
5	Lin Jia-jung (TPE)	16:51.651	4
6	Huo Jiaming (CHN)	16:38.703	2
7	Brahmateja Sathi (IND)	EL	
8	Mohammad Salehi (IRI)	EL	
9	Vikram Ingale (IND)	EL	
10	Chutipon Nakarungsu (THA)	EL	
11	Jeerasak Tassorn (THA)	EL	
