= Sung Ching-yang =

Taiwanese inline and long track speed skater

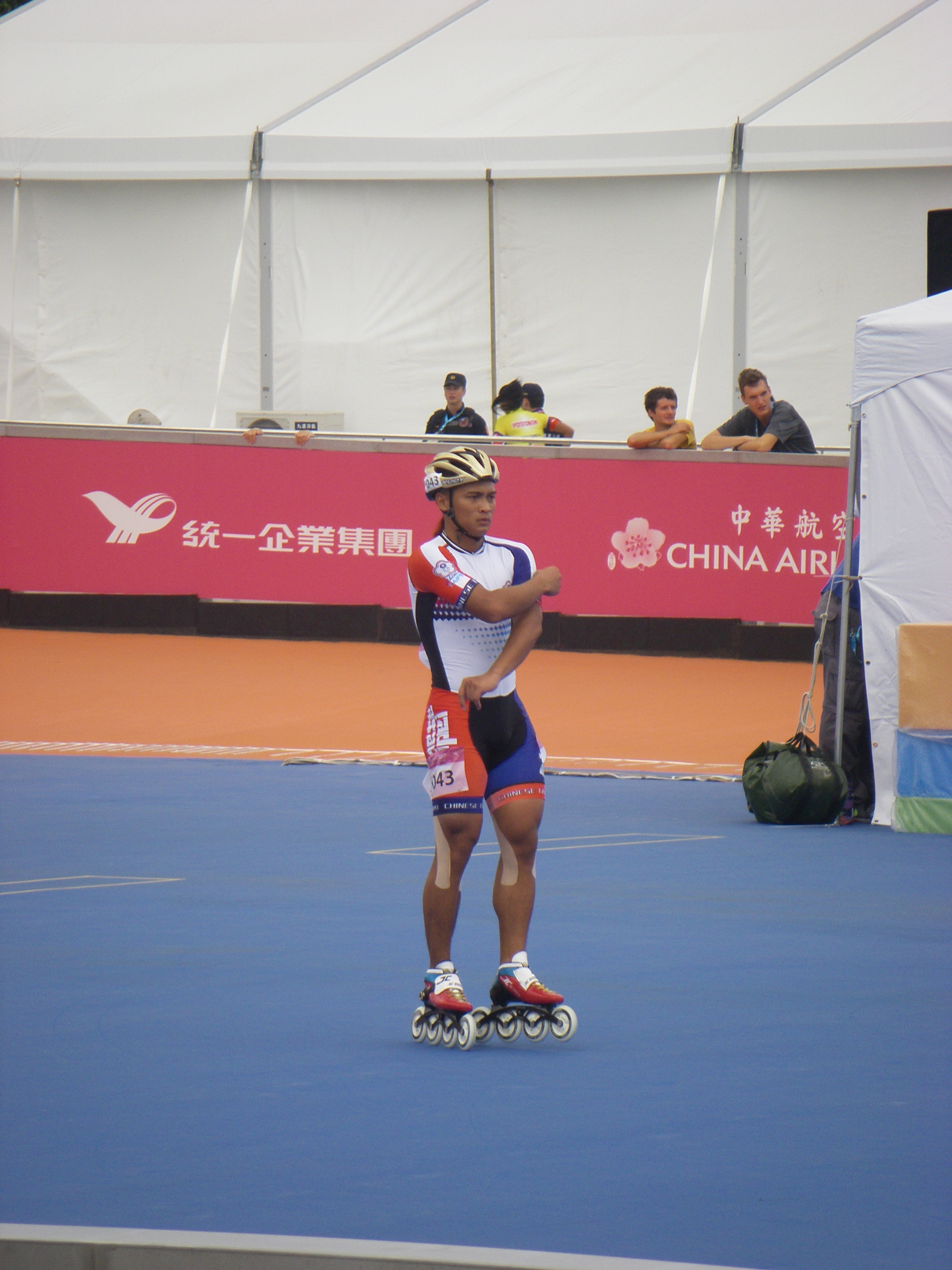
- 2017

Personal information
- Born: 18 October 1992 (age 33) Taiwan
- Height: 1.68 m (5 ft 6 in)
- Weight: 66 kg (146 lb)

Sport
- Country: Chinese Taipei
- Sport: Inline speed skating Long track speed skating
Medal record
Representing Chinese Taipei
Men's inline speed skating
Asian Games
Gold medal – first place	2010 Guangzhou	300 m time trial
Gold medal – first place	2010 Guangzhou	500 m sprint
Summer Universiade
Gold medal – first place	2017 Taipei	3000 m relay
Men's long track speed skating
Winter Universiade
Bronze medal – third place	2013 Trentino	1000 m

Sung Ching-yang
- Traditional Chinese: 宋青陽
- Simplified Chinese: 宋青阳
Transcriptions
Standard Mandarin
- Hanyu Pinyin: Sòng Qīngyáng
- IPA: [sʊ̂ŋ tɕʰíŋ jǎŋ]

Sung Ching-yang (Chinese: 宋青陽; pinyin: Sòng Qīngyáng; Mandarin pronunciation: [sʊ̂ŋ tɕʰíŋ jǎŋ]; born 18 October 1992) is a Taiwanese inline speed skater and long track speed skater who specialises in the sprint distances. In international competitions he competes under the flag of Chinese Taipei.

At the 2010 Asian Games in Guangzhou, Sung won two gold medals in roller sports, winning both the 300 metres time trial and the 500 metres sprint.

In ice skating Sung participated in the 2013–14 ISU Speed Skating World Cup – Men's 500 metres and 2013–14 ISU Speed Skating World Cup – Men's 1000 metres and has represented Chinese Taipei at the 2014 Winter Olympics in both events in Sochi. In December 2013 he won a bronze medal at the 1000 metres at the 2013 Winter Universiade speed skating.

Ching-Yang became the first speed skater to represent his country at the Winter Olympics (in 2014). In 2017 he was named to Chinese Taipei's team at the 2017 Asian Winter Games in Sapporo, Japan.

== Personal bests in speed skating ==
Sungs personal bests on the 500 and 1000 metres in long track speed skating are also national records for Taiwan.

Distance	Time	Venue	Date	Note
500 m	34.64 (NR)	Utah Olympic Oval	15 November 2013	World Cup
1000 m	1:08.83 (NR)	Utah Olympic Oval	17 November 2013	World Cup
1500 m	1:57.83	Baselga di Piné Stadio del Ghiaccio	15 December 2013	Winter Universiade
3000 m	4:21.00	Jilin Provincial Speed Skating Rink	22 February 2008	World Junior Championships
