= Roller speed skating at the 2010 Asian Games – Men's 500 metres sprint =

Men's 500 metres sprint at the 2010 Asian Games
- Venue: Guangzhou Velodrome
- Date: 23 November 2010
- Competitors: 11 from 6 nations

Medalists
gold medal	Sung Ching-yang	Chinese Taipei
silver medal	Lo Wei-lin	Chinese Taipei
bronze medal	Eum Han-jun	South Korea

The men's 500 metres sprint event at the 2010 Asian Games was held in Guangzhou Velodrome, Guangzhou on 23 November.

== Schedule ==
All times are China Standard Time (UTC+08:00)

Date	Time	Event
Tuesday, 23 November 2010	15:20	Heats
Tuesday, 23 November 2010	15:55	Final

== Results ==
=== Heats ===
- Qualification: First 2 in each heat (Q) advance to the final.

==== Heat 1 ====
Rank	Athlete	Time	Notes
1	Sung Ching-yang (TPE)	43.334	Q
2	Eum Han-jun (KOR)	43.414	Q
3	Prateek Raja (IND)	43.909	
4	Yuan Jianjin (CHN)	44.738	
5	Jeerasak Tassorn (THA)	45.907	

==== Heat 2 ====
Rank	Athlete	Time	Notes
1	Jang Su-chul (KOR)	42.720	Q
2	Lo Wei-lin (TPE)	43.213	Q
3	He Xin (CHN)	43.216	
4	Akash Aradhya (IND)	43.402	
5	Mohammad Salehi (IRI)	43.462	
6	Natthapong Chansiri (THA)	47.429	

=== Final ===
Rank	Athlete	Time
1st place, gold medalist(s)	Sung Ching-yang (TPE)	41.440
2nd place, silver medalist(s)	Lo Wei-lin (TPE)	41.447
3rd place, bronze medalist(s)	Eum Han-jun (KOR)	41.927
4	Jang Su-chul (KOR)	42.359
