= 2021 Inline Speed Skating World Championships =

Inline Speed Skating competition

2021 World Championships
- Location: Ibagué, Colombia
- Dates: 6–13 November

Champions
- Men: Colombia
- Women: Colombia

The 2021 Inline Speed Skating World Championships was the 69th edition of the Inline Speed Skating World Championships overall and was held in Ibagué, Colombia from 6 to 13 November 2021. It was held in both Elite and Junior categories. It was the 6th edition of the championship to take place in Colombia

== Medal summary ==
=== Men ===
Event	Gold	Silver	Bronze
Track
200m Dual Time Trial	Steven Villegas; Colombia	Pedro Causil; Colombia	Duccio Marsili; Italy
500m Sprint	Edwin Estrada; Colombia	Pedro Causil; Colombia	Ricardo Verdugo; Chile
1000m Sprint	Pedro Causil; Colombia	Chao Tsu-cheng; Chinese Taipei	Gwendal Le-Pivert; France
10000m points elimination	Daniel Zapata; Colombia	Jason Suttels; Belgium	Martin Ferrié; France
10000m elimination	Oscar Cobo; Colombia	Daniel Zapata; Colombia	Giuseppe Bramante; Italy
3000m relay	Pedro Causil; Oscar Cobo; Andrés Jiménez; Colombia	Elton De Souza; Martin Ferrié; Gwendal Le Pivert; France	Giuseppe Bramante; Daniele Di Stefano; Duccio Marsili; Italy
Road
100m Sprint	Ioseba Fernández; Spain	Steven Villegas; Colombia	Jorge Martínez; Mexico
1 Lap Sprint	Gwendal Le Pivert; France	Duccio Marsili; Italy	Ricardo Verdugo; Chile
10000m points	Nolan Beddiaf; France	Francisco Peula; Spain	Daniel Zapata; Colombia
15000m elimination	Martin Ferrié; France	Nolan Beddiaf; France	Manuel Saavedra; Colombia
42195m Marathon	Martin Ferrié; France	Andrés Gómez; Colombia	Chen Yan-cheng; Chinese Taipei

=== Women ===
Event	Gold	Silver	Bronze
Track
200m Dual Time Trial	Geiny Pájaro; Colombia	Mathilde Pédronno; France	María José Moya; Chile
500m Sprint	María Fernanda Timms; Colombia	Geiny Pájaro; Colombia	María Arias; Ecuador
1000m Sprint	Yang Ho-chen; Chinese Taipei	María Fernanda Timms; Colombia	Marie Dupuy; France
10000m points elimination	Fabriana Arias; Colombia	Luz Garzón; Colombia	Yang Ho-chen; Chinese Taipei
10000m elimination	Luz Garzón; Colombia	Fabriana Arias; Colombia	Marine Lefeuvre; France
3000m relay	Yang Ho-chen; Li Meng-chu; Liu Yi-hsuan; Chinese Taipei	María Fernanda Timms; Fabriana Arias; Gabriela Rueda; Colombia	Marine Lefeuvre; Marie Dupuy; Alison Bernardi; France
Road
100m Sprint	Geiny Pájaro; Colombia	María José Moya; Chile	Valeria Rodríguez; Colombia
1 Lap Sprint	Geiny Pájaro; Colombia	María José Moya; Chile	María Arias; Ecuador
10000m points	Gabriela Rueda; Colombia	Luz Garzón; Colombia	Angy Quintero; Venezuela
15000m elimination	Luz Garzón; Colombia	Gabriela Rueda; Colombia	Alejandra Traslaviña; Chile
42195m Marathon	Luz Garzón; Colombia	Gabriela Rueda; Colombia	Marine Lefeuvre; France

== Medal table ==
* Host nation (Colombia)

Rank	Nation	Gold	Silver	Bronze	Total
1	Colombia*	15	13	3	31
2	France	4	3	6	13
3	Chinese Taipei	2	1	2	5
4	Spain	1	1	0	2
5	Chile	0	2	4	6
6	Italy	0	1	3	4
7	Belgium	0	1	0	1
8	Ecuador	0	0	2	2
9	Mexico	0	0	1	1
9	Venezuela	0	0	1	1
Totals (10 entries)		22	22	22	66
