= Heeral Sadhu =

Skating track athlete

Personal information
- Nationality: Indian

Sport
- Sport: Roller sports
Medal record
Representing India
Asian Games
Bronze medal – third place	2022 Hangzhou	Women's Speed skating 3,000 m relay

Heeral Sadhu is an Indian speed skating track athlete. She won a bronze medal in the women's 3000m relay event at the 2022 Asian Games.
