= Karthika Jagadeeswaran =

Indian speed skater

Personal information
- Nationality: Indian
- Born: 12 October 2007 (age 18)

Sport
- Sport: Roller sports
Medal record
Women's inline speed skating
Representing India
Asian Games
Bronze medal – third place	2022 Hangzhou	3,000 m relay

Karthika Jagadeeswaran (born 12 October 2007) is an Indian speed skating track athlete. She won a bronze medal in the women's 3000m relay event at the 2022 Asian Games.
