= Skateboarding at the 2022 Asian Games – Women's park =

Women's park at the 2022 Asian Games
- Venue: Qiantang Roller Sports Centre
- Date: 24–25 September 2023
- Competitors: 9 from 7 nations

Medalists
gold medal	Hinano Kusaki	Japan
silver medal	Li Yujuan	China
bronze medal	Mao Jiasi	China

The women's park competition at the 2022 Asian Games took place on 24 and 25 September 2023 at the Qiantang Roller Sports Centre.

== Schedule ==
All times are China Standard Time (UTC+08:00)

Date	Time	Event
Sunday, 24 September 2023	09:30	Qualification
Monday, 25 September 2023	09:30	Final

== Results ==
=== Qualification ===
Rank	Athlete	Run 1	Run 2	Best
1	Hinano Kusaki (JPN)	78.06	44.25	78.06
2	Mao Jiasi (CHN)	77.06	58.56	77.06
3	Mei Sugawara (JPN)	75.33	41.96	75.33
4	Cho Hyun-ju (KOR)	63.65	70.36	70.36
5	Lin Yi-fan (TPE)	55.77	62.00	62.00
6	Li Yujuan (CHN)	35.93	58.40	58.40
7	Mazel Paris Alegado (PHI)	44.86	56.96	56.96
8	Bunga Nyimas (INA)	33.15	41.30	41.30
9	Orapan Tongkong (THA)	28.70	36.51	36.51

=== Final ===
Rank	Athlete	Run 1	Run 2	Run 3	Best
1st place, gold medalist(s)	Hinano Kusaki (JPN)	82.21	87.78	88.87	88.87
2nd place, silver medalist(s)	Li Yujuan (CHN)	70.75	84.35	85.48	85.48
3rd place, bronze medalist(s)	Mao Jiasi (CHN)	7.00	75.66	80.46	80.46
4	Cho Hyun-ju (KOR)	55.71	78.97	28.94	78.97
5	Mei Sugawara (JPN)	59.76	26.20	73.85	73.85
6	Bunga Nyimas (INA)	16.50	60.41	28.72	60.41
7	Mazel Paris Alegado (PHI)	52.85	24.83	24.50	52.85
8	Lin Yi-fan (TPE)	37.97	23.96	45.99	45.99
