= Roller speed skating at the 2022 Asian Games – Men's 3000 metres relay =

Men's 3000 metres relay at the 2022 Asian Games
- Venue: Qiantang Roller Sports Centre
- Date: 2 October 2023
- Competitors: 22 from 7 nations

Medalists
gold medal	Chinese Taipei; Chen Yan-cheng, Chao Tsu-cheng, Huang Yu-lin, Ko Fu-shiuan
silver medal	South Korea; Choi In-ho, Choi Gwang-ho, Jung Cheol-won
bronze medal	India; Anandkumar Velkumar, Siddhant Kamble, Vikram Ingale

The men's 3000 metres relay event at the 2022 Asian Games was held in Qiantang Roller Sports Centre, Hangzhou on 2 October 2023.

== Schedule ==
All times are China Standard Time (UTC+08:00)

Date	Time	Event
Monday, 2 October 2023	09:00	Preliminary
Monday, 2 October 2023	09:55	Final

== Results ==
Legend

- DSQ–TF — Disqualified for technical fault

=== Preliminary ===
- Qualification: First in each heat (Q) and the next 3 fastest (q) advance to the final.

==== Heat 1 ====
Rank	Team	Time	Notes
1	Chinese Taipei (TPE); Chen Yan-cheng; Ko Fu-shiuan; Huang Yu-lin	4:19.950	Q
2	Thailand (THA); Noppron Choochorngamket; Pumipit Sintong; Suttikan Puakukam	4:32.175	q
3	Vietnam (VIE); Nguyễn Nhựt Linh; Phạm Nhật Minh Quang; Mai Hoài Phương	5:09.631	

==== Heat 2 ====
Rank	Team	Time	Notes
1	South Korea (KOR); Choi In-ho; Choi Gwang-ho; Jung Cheol-won	4:13.348	Q
2	India (IND); Anandkumar Velkumar; Siddhant Kamble; Vikram Ingale	4:15.126	q
3	Iran (IRI); Kiarash Shamohammadi; Mohammad Amin Heidari; Amir Behzadi	4:16.520	q
4	Singapore (SGP); Chua Qi En; Ng Ping Siang; Lucas Ng	4:42.712	

=== Final ===
Rank	Team	Time
1st place, gold medalist(s)	Chinese Taipei (TPE); Chen Yan-cheng; Chao Tsu-cheng; Huang Yu-lin	4:05.692
2nd place, silver medalist(s)	South Korea (KOR); Choi In-ho; Choi Gwang-ho; Jung Cheol-won	4:05.702
3rd place, bronze medalist(s)	India (IND); Anandkumar Velkumar; Siddhant Kamble; Vikram Ingale	4:10.128
4	Iran (IRI); Kiarash Shamohammadi; Mohammad Amin Heidari; Amir Behzadi	4:16.962
5	Thailand (THA); Noppron Choochorngamket; Pumipit Sintong; Suttikan Puakukam	DSQ–TF
