= Roller speed skating at the 2010 Asian Games – Women's 500 metres sprint =

Women's 500 metres sprint at the 2010 Asian Games
- Venue: Guangzhou Velodrome
- Date: 23 November 2010
- Competitors: 9 from 5 nations

Medalists
gold medal	Huang Yu-ting	Chinese Taipei
silver medal	An Yi-seul	South Korea
bronze medal	Zang Yinglu	China

The women's 500 metres sprint event at the 2010 Asian Games was held in Guangzhou Velodrome, Guangzhou on 23 November.

== Schedule ==
All times are China Standard Time (UTC+08:00)

Date	Time	Event
Tuesday, 23 November 2010	15:00	Heats
Tuesday, 23 November 2010	15:45	Final

== Results ==
=== Heats ===
- Qualification: First 2 in each heat (Q) advance to the final.

==== Heat 1 ====
Rank	Athlete	Time	Notes
1	An Yi-seul (KOR)	45.734	Q
2	Lim Jin-seon (KOR)	45.984	Q
3	Chen Ying-chu (TPE)	45.985	
4	Niloufar Mardani (IRI)	47.891	
5	Srishty (IND)	48.085	

==== Heat 2 ====
Rank	Athlete	Time	Notes
1	Huang Yu-ting (TPE)	45.950	Q
2	Zang Yinglu (CHN)	46.063	Q
3	Li Wenwen (CHN)	46.464	
4	Varsha S. Puranik (IND)	48.617	

=== Final ===
Rank	Athlete	Time
1st place, gold medalist(s)	Huang Yu-ting (TPE)	44.850
2nd place, silver medalist(s)	An Yi-seul (KOR)	44.885
3rd place, bronze medalist(s)	Zang Yinglu (CHN)	45.053
4	Lim Jin-seon (KOR)	45.501
