= Roller speed skating at the 2010 Asian Games – Men's 300 metres time trial =

Men's 300 metres time trial at the 2010 Asian Games
- Venue: Guangzhou Velodrome
- Date: 23 November 2010
- Competitors: 11 from 6 nations

Medalists
| gold medal | Sung Ching-yang | Chinese Taipei |
| silver medal | Lo Wei-lin | Chinese Taipei |
| bronze medal | Jang Su-chul | South Korea |

The men's 300 metres time trial event at the 2010 Asian Games was held in Guangzhou Velodrome, Guangzhou on 23 November.

== Schedule ==
All times are China Standard Time (UTC+08:00)

| Date | Time | Event |
|---|---|---|
| Tuesday, 23 November 2010 | 09:35 | Final |

== Results ==
| Rank | Athlete | Time |
|---|---|---|
| 1st place, gold medalist(s) | Sung Ching-yang (TPE) | 24.777 |
| 2nd place, silver medalist(s) | Lo Wei-lin (TPE) | 25.026 |
| 3rd place, bronze medalist(s) | Jang Su-chul (KOR) | 25.267 |
| 4 | Eum Han-jun (KOR) | 25.620 |
| 5 | Yuan Jianjin (CHN) | 25.622 |
| 6 | He Xin (CHN) | 25.770 |
| 7 | Mohammad Salehi (IRI) | 25.864 |
| 8 | Prateek Raja (IND) | 26.460 |
| 9 | Jeerasak Tassorn (THA) | 27.994 |
| 10 | Brahmateja Sathi (IND) | 28.683 |
| 11 | Chutipon Nakarungsu (THA) | 38.882 |
