= Roller speed skating at the 2022 Asian Games – Women's 3000 metres relay =

Women's 3000 metres relay at the 2022 Asian Games
- Venue: Qiantang Roller Sports Centre
- Date: 2 October 2023
- Competitors: 15 from 5 nations

Medalists
gold medal	Chinese Taipei; Liu Yi-hsuan, Li Meng-chu, Yang Ho-chen
silver medal	South Korea; Lee Seul, Park Min-jeong, Lee Ye-rim
bronze medal	India; Karthika Jagadeeshwaran, Heeral Sadhu, Aarathy Kasturi Raj

The women's 3000 metres relay event at the 2022 Asian Games was held in Qiantang Roller Sports Centre, Hangzhou on 2 October 2023.

== Schedule ==
All times are China Standard Time (UTC+08:00)

Date	Time	Event
Monday, 2 October 2023	09:30	Final

== Results ==
Rank	Team	Time
1st place, gold medalist(s)	Chinese Taipei (TPE); Liu Yi-hsuan; Li Meng-chu; Yang Ho-chen	4:19.447
2nd place, silver medalist(s)	South Korea (KOR); Lee Seul; Park Min-jeong; Lee Ye-rim	4:21.146
3rd place, bronze medalist(s)	India (IND); Karthika Jagadeeshwaran; Heeral Sadhu; Aarathy Kasturi Raj	4:34.861
4	Iran (IRI); Negin Sheikhi; Melika Manouchehrirad; Nahal Moghaddam	4:41.543
5	Thailand (THA); Pletpisut Siamchai; Pentipphart Chavana; Irada Lim	4:41.625
