= Roller speed skating at the 2010 Asian Games – Women's 300 metres time trial =

Women's 300 metres time trial at the 2010 Asian Games
- Venue: Guangzhou Velodrome
- Date: 23 November 2010
- Competitors: 10 from 6 nations

Medalists
gold medal	An Yi-seul	South Korea
silver medal	Zang Yinglu	China
bronze medal	Li Wenwen	China

The women's 300 metres time trial event at the 2010 Asian Games was held in Guangzhou Velodrome, Guangzhou on 23 November.

== Schedule ==
All times are China Standard Time (UTC+08:00)

Date	Time	Event
Tuesday, 23 November 2010	09:00	Final

== Results ==
Legend

- DNS — Did not start

Rank	Athlete	Time
1st place, gold medalist(s)	An Yi-seul (KOR)	26.870
2nd place, silver medalist(s)	Zang Yinglu (CHN)	26.893
3rd place, bronze medalist(s)	Li Wenwen (CHN)	27.362
4	Chen Ying-chu (TPE)	27.440
5	Lim Jin-seon (KOR)	27.557
6	Huang Yu-ting (TPE)	27.699
7	Varsha S. Puranik (IND)	29.765
8	Kanika Bhalla (IND)	30.250
—	Niloufar Mardani (IRI)	DNS
—	Nachi Shinozuka (JPN)	DNS
