= Guo Dan (speed skater) =

Chinese speed skater (born 1990)

Maria Guo Dan
Personal information
- Full name: Guo Dan
- Nationality: Chinese
- Born: 6 December 1990 (age 35) Beijing, China

Sport
- Country: China
- Sport: Inline speed skating
Medal record
Representing China
Women's road inline speed skating
World Championships
Bronze medal – third place	2025 Beidaihe	10000 m points
World Games
Gold medal – first place	2013 Cali	20000 m elimination race
Asian Games
Silver medal – second place	2018 Jakarta-Palembang	20000 m elimination race
Women's track inline speed skating
World Championships
Bronze medal – third place	2025 Beidaihe	5000 m points

Guo Dan (Chinese: 郭丹; pinyin: Guō Dān; Mandarin pronunciation: [kwó tán]; born 6 December 1990) is a Chinese female roller skater who is also specialised in speed skating. She took the sport of roller skating at the age of three and has competed at several international competitions as a roller skater. She most notably secured a gold medal in the women's 20000m elimination race during the 2013 World Games, which was held in Colombia.

Guo Dan decided to take the sport of speed skating in late 2015 as she was aiming to qualify for the 2018 Winter Olympics. She took part in the 2017 Asian Winter Games and competed in the women's mass start event. Guo Dan was selected to represent China at the 2018 Winter Olympics and competed in the women's mass start event.
