= Anandkumar Velkumar =

Indian inline speed skater (born 2003)

Personal information
- Born: 19 January 2003 (age 23) Tamil Nadu, India
- Height: 1.8 m (5 ft 11 in)

Sport
- Sport: Roller sports
- Event: Inline speed skating
Medal record
Men's inline speed skating
Representing India
World Games
Bronze medal – third place	2025 Chengdu	1000 m sprint
World Championships
Gold medal – first place	2025 Beidaihe	Marathon
Gold medal – first place	2025 Beidaihe	1000 m sprint
Bronze medal – third place	2025 Beidaihe	500 m sprint
World Skate Games
Gold medal – first place	2026 Asunción	Marathon
Silver medal – second place	2026 Asunción	1000 m sprint
Bronze medal – third place	2024 Rome	500 m sprint
Bronze medal – third place	2026 Asunción	500 m sprint
Asian Games
Bronze medal – third place	2022 Hangzhou	3000 m team relay
Junior World Championships
Silver medal – second place	2021 Ibagué	15,000 m elimination

Anandkumar Velkumar (born 19 January 2003) is an Indian inline speed skater. At the 2025 World Championships, he won gold medals in the 1000 m sprint and marathon events, becoming the first Indian skater to claim a world title.

== Early life ==
Anandkumar hails from Tamil Nadu. He is studying computer science at the College of Engineering, Guindy. His elder sister Subi Suvetha Velkumar is also an Indian skater.

== Career ==
Velkumar became the first Indian to win a medal at any World Championships in speed skating, with a silver medal at the 2021 Junior World Championships in the 15 km elimination event. He was part of the bronze medal-winning men's 3000 m relay team at the 2022 Asian Games on 2 October 2023, alongside Vikram Rajendra Ingale and Siddhant Rahul Kamble. Velkumar also won a historic bronze in the 1000 m sprint at the 2025 World Games. He went on to create history by winning gold medals in marathon and 1000 m sprint at the 2025 World Championships. He also won a bronze medal in the 500 m sprint at the same event.
