= Margielyn Didal =

Filipino skateboarder

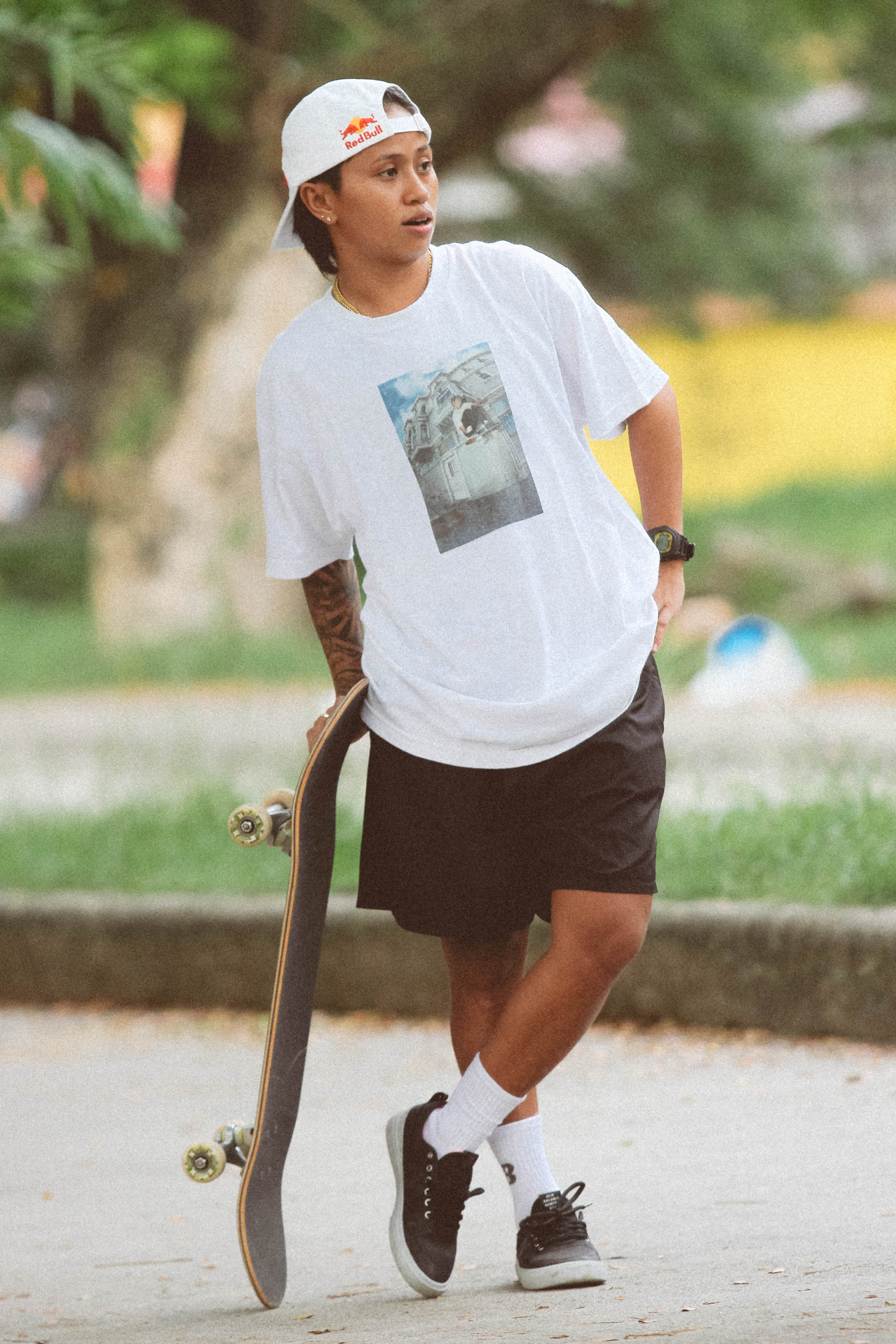
- Margielyn Didal in 2021 at V&G Grounds in Consolacion.

Personal information
- Full name: Margielyn Arda Didal
- Nickname: Margie
- Nationality: Filipino
- Born: April 19, 1999 (age 27) Cebu City, Philippines
- Occupation: Professional skateboarder
- Weight: 108 lb (49 kg)

Sport
- Country: Philippines
- Sport: Skateboarding
- Style: Street
- Coached by: Daniel Bautista

Achievements and titles
- Olympic finals: 7th (2020)
- National finals: 2019 Philippine National Skateboarding Championship: Women's street; Gold
Medal record
Women's skateboard
Representing Philippines
Event	1st	2nd	3rd
Asian Games	1	0	0
Southeast Asian Games	2	0	0
Total	3	0	0
Asian Games
Gold medal – first place	2018 Jakarta–Palembang	Street
Southeast Asian Games
Gold medal – first place	2019 Philippines	Game of skate
Gold medal – first place	2019 Philippines	Street

Margielyn "Margie" Arda Didal (born April 19, 1999) is a Filipino professional street skateboarder who rose to fame when she competed in the X Games Minneapolis 2018 and won a gold medal in the 2018 Asian Games.

== Early life and family ==
Margielyn Didal was born on April 19, 1999, in Cebu City, Philippines to Lito and Julie Didal. Her father is a carpenter and her mother is a sidewalk vendor selling kwek kwek. She is the fourth of five siblings.

== Career ==
=== Early years ===
Didal started skateboarding with friends at the now-closed Concave Park in Cebu. When the park closed, she and her friends struggled to find a new place to skateboard. She has narrated how she and her friends were apprehended by police officers and security guards when they were caught practicing in the streets and in abandoned areas, as well as one account of being barred entry from a shopping mall due to her having a skateboard. Didal's parents were initially skeptical of Didal pursuing a career in skateboarding but later supported her decision.

She approached Daniel Bautista, who would later be her coach in the 2018 Asian Games, and borrowed boards from Bautista's friends. Bautista said that Didal became better than boys in her area and he recognized her talent. In 2012, Didal started to compete in local tournaments in Cebu City, particularly those organized by Jeson L. Guardo of G-Concepts, in Barangay Tisa in Cebu City.

Sometime in 2014, she injured her right arm, and in December of the same year she severely sprained her right ankle, her dominant foot. The effect of the latter injury lingered for some years. To manage the ankle sprain, Didal underwent months of therapy at Cardia Olympia and intense assessment at the Red Bull High Performance Training Center in Santa Monica, California in July 2019.

=== Street League Skateboarding ===
Didal would later compete in tournaments abroad and secure sponsors. She became the first Filipino skateboarder to compete in Street League Skateboarding when she participated in the SLS PRO Open in London, England on May 26, 2018. In the preliminary round, she finished fourth and advanced to the final round to finish eighth overall.

Due to her performance in the SLS, a local wrote a letter to Cebu City Mayor Tommy Osmeña asking him to build a skate park in the city. Osmeña responded that if Cebu City won the 2018 Philippine National Games, half of the prize money would be allotted for a sports and skating park at the South Road Properties.

In the 2019 SLS World Championship in Rio de Janeiro, Brazil, Didal reached the semifinals, becoming the first representative of the Philippines to do so along with Christiana Means. Didal failed to advance to the finals, finishing 14th overall with 20 points.

=== X Games ===
Didal was invited to compete at the X Games, becoming the first competitor to formally represent the Philippines in the games. She participated in the 2018 X Games in Minneapolis, Minnesota, in the United States.

=== 2018 Asian Games ===
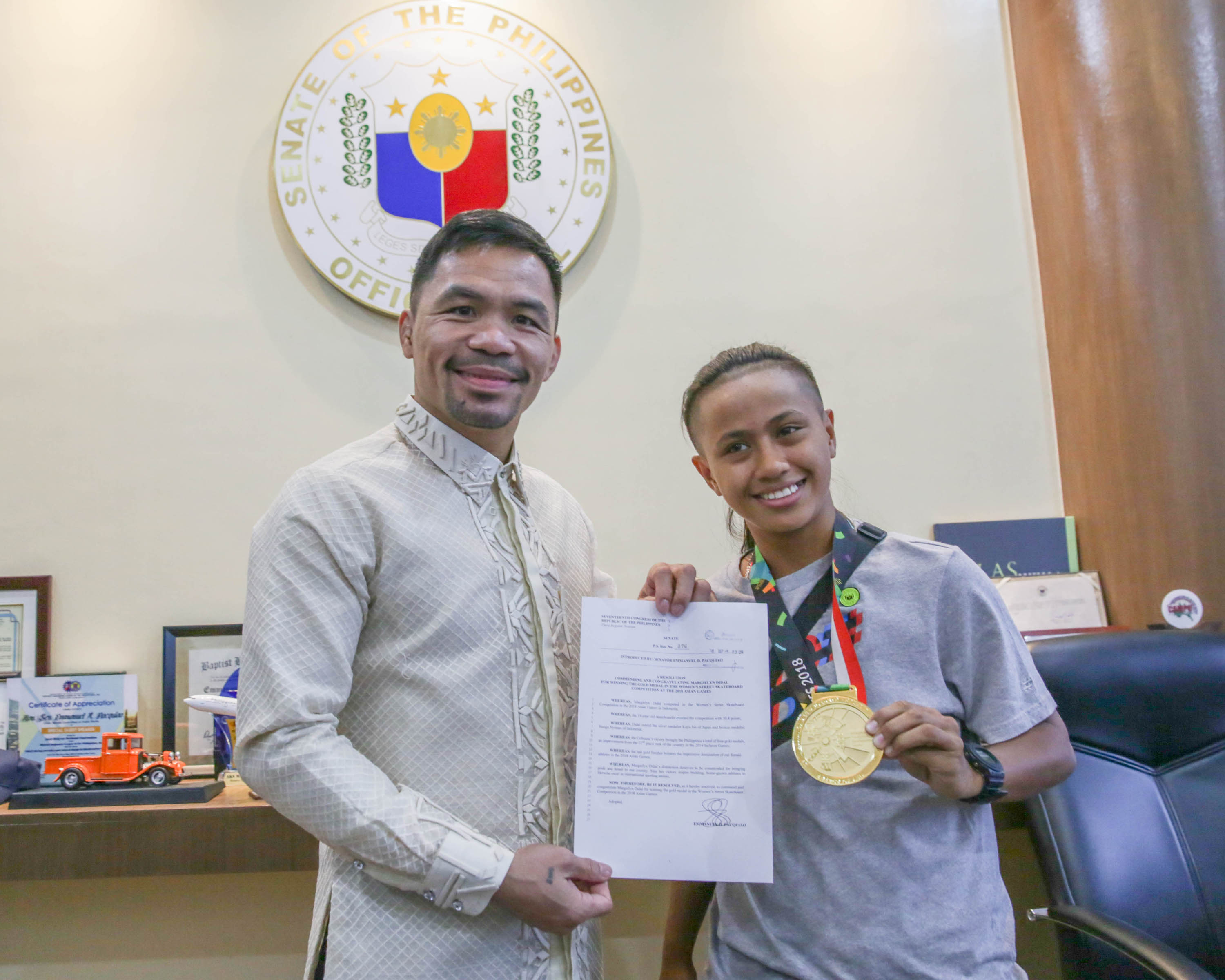
Senator Manny Pacquiao with Didal and her Asian Games medal.

Didal competed for the Philippines in the women's street skateboarding event. She trained for two months in the United States prior to the event. Didal won the fourth gold for the Philippines at the 2018 Asian Games. In seven attempts, Didal accumulated 30.4 points to win the gold while silver medalist Isa Kaya of Japan and bronze medalist Bunga Nyimas of Indonesia accumulated 25 and 19.8 points respectively. She scored 14.2 points in her first two runs and garnered the most points in the fourth run, scoring 8.9 points by performing the backside 50/50, 360-degree flip out for the first time in a major competition. She earned the most points in the women's street park event.

Following her achievement, she was named as the flag bearer of the Philippine delegation for the closing ceremony of the games. As a gold medalist in the Games she will be entitled to ₱6 million of bonuses, which she plans to use to help her family start a business.

Cebu City Mayor Tommy Osmeña reiterated earlier plans for his city saying that his sister has pledged a ₱5 million donation to build a skate park at the South Road Properties. As of January 2020, talks regarding the possible construction of the skate park are still being held.

=== National Championship ===
Didal participated in the inaugural Philippine National Skateboarding Championship held in Santa Rosa, Laguna in July 2019, where she won the gold medal for the women's street event.

=== South East Asian Games ===
During the 2019 Southeast Asian Games, Didal won two gold medals in women's Game of Skate and street skateboarding.

=== 2020 Tampa Pro Women's Open Finals ===
Didal finished 3rd at the 2020 Tampa Pro Women's Open Finals in Florida.

=== 2020 Summer Olympics ===
Didal qualified for the 2020 Summer Olympics in Tokyo, where skateboarding made its Olympic debut. Competing in the women's street event, Didal advanced to the finals, placing 7th.

Didal had her own custom skate park built in Soul Sierra, Cebu City. It first opened in early 2021 and became the training venue of the Philippine national skateboarding team, including herself.

=== 2022 Red Bull Skate Level ===
In October 2022, Didal competed at the Red Bull Skate Level. However she sustained a fractured left ankle and undergo surgery. Consequentially, she missed two qualifying events for the 2024 Summer Olympics as well. By July 2023, she has recovered enough to be able to perform a 360 flip.

=== 2022 Asian Games ===
Didal returns to the Asian Games in the 2022 edition in Guangzhou, China to defend her title in street after being sidelined for around 11 months. She was able to advance to the final round of the women's street event of the games postponed by a year due to the COVID-19 pandemic. A hobbling Didal finished last among eight skaters in the final, unable to finish the last three of five tricks

== Other accolades ==
Time magazine included Didal in its list of "25 Most Influential Teens of 2018," recognizing her feat in winning a gold medal in the 2018 Asian Games, which it said would "cement skateboarding's status as a serious sport" in the Philippines. Didal was also given the Asia Skater of the Year award for 2020.

== Media appearances ==
Didal's life story was dramatized in an episode of Maalaala Mo Kaya, a drama anthology series, aired in 2018 on ABS-CBN. She was portrayed by Elisse Joson. Beyond the Board, a documentary film featuring her biography and skateboarding career was released in 2024.

Didal appears as a playable skater in the 2025 video game Tony Hawk's Pro Skater 3 + 4.

== Personal life ==
Didal is a member of the LGBTQ community, saying in an interview with ABS-CBN that her parents accept her identity. She has a girlfriend, named Jozel, with whom she has been in a relationship for eight years as of February 2023. In February 2023, the two got engaged. Aside from her coach, Bautista, Didal also looks up to Hong Kong national team coach Warren Stuart, who is also one of her sponsors, and Brian Siswojo of the 8Five2 skateshop as her inspiration in skateboarding.

Didal took up her elementary studies at Lahug Elementary School until dropping out in seventh grade in order to pursue a career in skateboarding, though she expressed plans to continue her education though the Alternative Learning System (ALS).
