= Aarathy Kasturi Raj =

Indian speed skating track athlete

Personal information
- Nationality: Indian
- Born: 22 May 1994 (age 32)

Sport
- Sport: Roller sports
Medal record
Representing India
Asian Games
| Bronze medal – third place | 2022 Hangzhou | Women's Speed skating 3,000 m relay |

Aarathy Kasturi Raj (22 May 1994) is an Indian speed skating track athlete. She won a bronze medal in the women's 3000m relay event at the 2022 Asian Games.

== Early life and education ==
Aarathy's father C. Kasturi Raj is a businessman and her mother, Mala Raj is a gynaecologist. She married Tamil Nadu cricketer Sandeep Warrier in 2019. She completed her MBBS at Ramachandra Medical College in Chennai and her post-graduation in Clinical Embryology. She trains under coach Sathyamoorthy at the Nehru Stadium in Chennai and also trained under Belgian coach Ferre Spruyt. She works at the family-run hospital.
