= Hinano Kusaki =

Japanese skateboarder (born 2008)

Hinano Kusaki 草木 ひなの
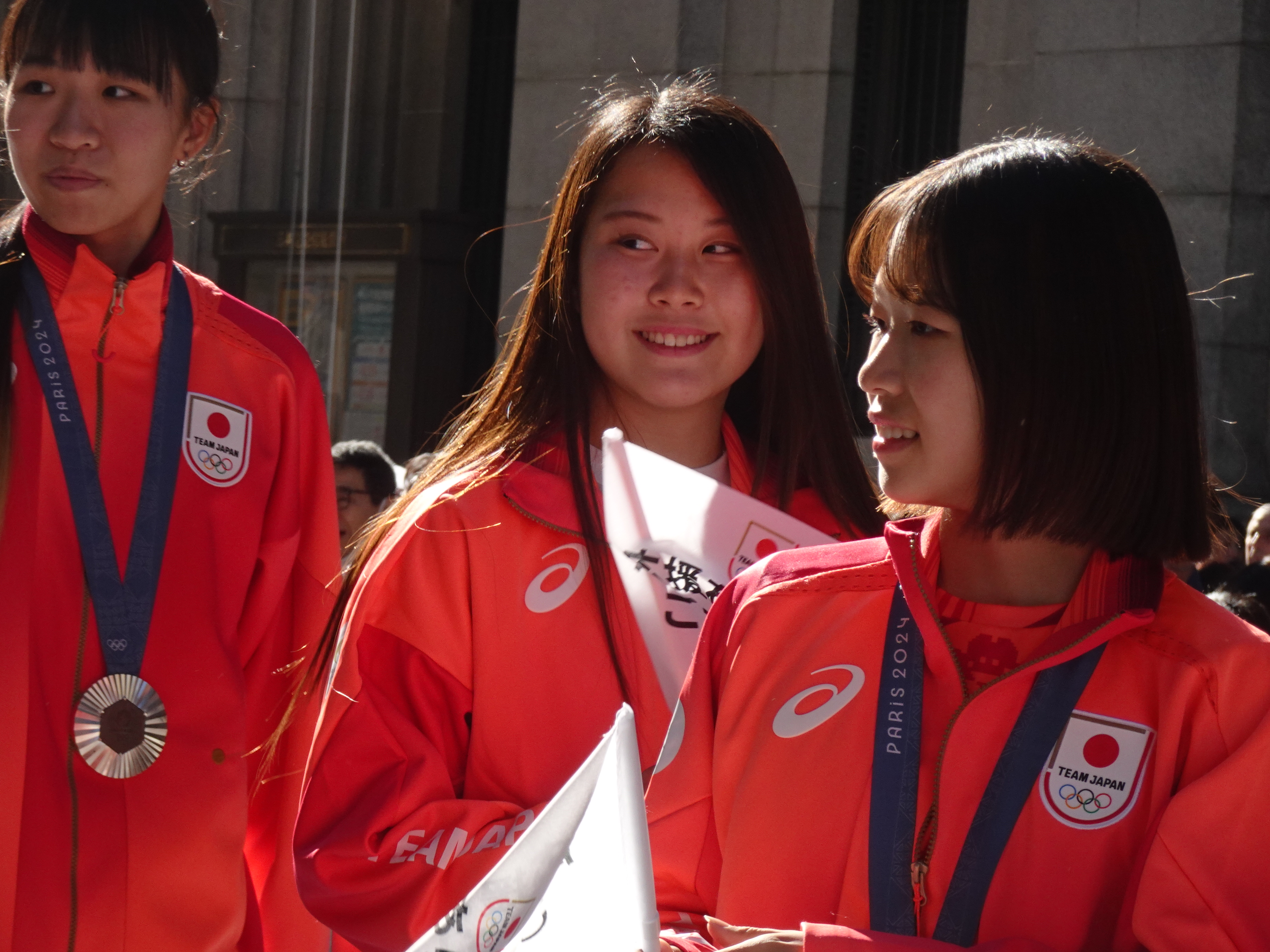
- Kusaki (center) in November 2024

Personal information
- Native name: 草木ひなの
- Born: 4 April 2008 (age 18) Tsukuba, Ibaraki, Japan
- Occupation: Skateboarder

Sport
- Country: Japan
- Sport: Skateboarding
- Position: Regular footed
- Rank: 2nd (February 2025)
- Event: Park
Medal record
Women's park skateboarding
Representing Japan
World Championship
Silver medal – second place	2023 Rome	Park
Silver medal – second place	2024 Rome	Park
Asian Games
Gold medal – first place	2022 Hangzhou	Park

Hinano Kusaki (Japanese: 草木ひなの, Hepburn: Kusaki Hinano; born 4 April 2008) is a Japanese professional skateboarder. She won a gold medal in the women's park event at the 2022 Asian Games.
