= Skateboarding at the 2022 Asian Games – Men's street =

Men's street at the 2022 Asian Games
- Venue: Qiantang Roller Sports Centre
- Date: 26–27 September 2023
- Competitors: 14 from 7 nations

Medalists
gold medal	Zhang Jie	China
silver medal	Sanggoe Darma Tanjung	Indonesia
bronze medal	Su Jianjun	China

The men's street competition at the 2022 Asian Games took place on 26 and 27 September 2023 at Qiantang Roller Sports Centre.

== Schedule ==
All times are China Standard Time (UTC+08:00)

Date	Time	Event
Tuesday, 26 September 2023	15:00	Qualification
Wednesday, 27 September 2023	14:00	Final

== Results ==
=== Qualification ===
Rank	Athlete	Run 1	Run 2	Best
1	Ginwoo Onodera (JPN)	79.34	80.47	80.47
2	Jeong Ji-hoon (KOR)	74.49	34.32	74.49
3	Zhang Jie (CHN)	72.56	31.38	72.56
4	Sanggoe Darma Tanjung (INA)	55.76	68.11	68.11
5	Su Jianjun (CHN)	57.03	59.99	59.99
6	Aimu Yamazuki (JPN)	54.12	16.23	54.12
7	Mak Feliciano (PHI)	52.73	23.10	52.73
8	Basral Graito Hutomo (INA)	48.88	22.03	48.88
9	Thawatchai Siangoueng (THA)	42.75	17.83	42.75
10	Motic Panugalinog (PHI)	34.03	39.36	39.36
11	Napat Wijidjarung (THA)	29.53	30.27	30.27
12	Jo Sung-min (KOR)	26.84	27.20	27.20
13	Luk Chun Yin (HKG)	12.69	19.91	19.91
14	Lee Ka Lung (HKG)	17.22	17.59	17.59

=== Final ===
Rank	Athlete	Run		Trick					Total
Rank	Athlete	1	2	1	2	3	4	5	Total
1st place, gold medalist(s)	Zhang Jie (CHN)	70.58	~~66.97~~	78.67	~~67.76~~	~~0.00~~	81.89	~~0.00~~	231.14
2nd place, silver medalist(s)	Sanggoe Darma Tanjung (INA)	~~62.54~~	64.77	~~0.00~~	68.08	67.78	~~0.00~~	~~0.00~~	200.63
3rd place, bronze medalist(s)	Su Jianjun (CHN)	~~45.32~~	54.44	68.04	73.25	~~0.00~~	~~0.00~~	~~0.00~~	195.73
4	Basral Graito Hutomo (INA)	~~18.89~~	22.30	74.99	~~0.00~~	~~0.00~~	~~0.00~~	76.50	173.79
5	Aimu Yamazuki (JPN)	63.71	~~58.60~~	0.00	~~0.00~~	~~0.00~~	67.55	~~0.00~~	131.26
6	Jeong Ji-hoon (KOR)	24.82	~~24.09~~	0.00	~~0.00~~	~~0.00~~	78.49	~~0.00~~	103.31
7	Ginwoo Onodera (JPN)	76.39	~~64.75~~	0.00	0.00	~~0.00~~	~~0.00~~	~~0.00~~	76.39
8	Mak Feliciano (PHI)	48.59	~~36.46~~	0.00	0.00	~~0.00~~	~~0.00~~	~~0.00~~	48.59
