= Skateboarding at the 2018 Asian Games – Men's street =

Men's street at the 2018 Asian Games
- Venue: Jakabaring Sport City
- Date: 28–29 August 2018
- Competitors: 18 from 10 nations

Medalists
gold medal	Keyaki Ike	Japan
silver medal	Sanggoe Darma Tanjung	Indonesia
bronze medal	Eun Ju-won	South Korea

The men's street competition at the 2018 Asian Games took place on 28 and 29 August at the JSC Skateboard Stadium.

== Schedule ==
All times are Western Indonesia Time (UTC+07:00)

Date	Time	Event
Tuesday, 28 August 2018	11:40	Preliminary
Wednesday, 29 August 2018	12:20	Final

== Results ==
=== Preliminary ===
Rank	Athlete	Run		Trick					Total
Rank	Athlete	1	2	1	2	3	4	5	Total
1	Sanggoe Darma Tanjung (INA)	~~6.4~~	8.1	~~7.2~~	7.7	~~7.2~~	7.7	7.8	31.3
2	Keyaki Ike (JPN)	~~6.6~~	7.2	7.0	~~0.1~~	7.0	7.1	~~0.1~~	28.3
3	Oat Athiwat (THA)	6.2	5.9	~~5.1~~	~~0.1~~	7.6	7.2	~~0.1~~	26.9
4	Gao Qunxiang (CHN)	7.7	8.0	5.6	4.2	~~0.1~~	~~0.1~~	~~0.1~~	25.5
5	Eun Ju-won (KOR)	6.4	5.7	~~4.6~~	6.2	6.6	~~4.9~~	~~0.1~~	24.9
6	Petch Napat (THA)	3.7	4.9	~~0.1~~	5.9	7.6	~~0.1~~	~~0.1~~	22.1
7	Aldwien Angkawidjaya (INA)	6.9	4.5	~~0.1~~	~~0.1~~	~~0.1~~	5.0	5.4	21.8
8	Yaziru Amiru (MAS)	6.4	5.3	4.8	5.3	~~0.1~~	~~0.1~~	~~0.1~~	21.8
9	Yu Ji-woong (KOR)	4.5	5.1	4.2	~~0.1~~	7.0	~~0.1~~	~~0.1~~	20.8
10	Kensuke Sasaoka (JPN)	3.7	6.1	4.7	~~2.9~~	~~0.1~~	5.4	~~0.1~~	19.9
11	Lu Hung-chen (TPE)	5.9	4.8	~~0.1~~	5.1	3.1	~~2.2~~	~~0.1~~	18.9
12	Ian Nuriman Amri (MAS)	4.0	4.3	3.3	6.2	~~2.6~~	~~0.1~~	~~0.1~~	17.8
13	Jeffrey Gonzales (PHI)	4.8	4.7	0.1	~~0.1~~	~~0.1~~	6.6	~~0.1~~	16.2
14	Xiang Xiaojun (CHN)	5.0	7.0	0.1	~~0.1~~	~~0.1~~	2.7	~~0.1~~	14.8
15	Neris Thapa (NEP)	3.4	3.6	~~0.1~~	5.2	~~0.1~~	2.1	~~0.1~~	14.3
16	Johnnie Tang (HKG)	4.1	4.4	~~0.1~~	~~0.1~~	2.3	~~0.1~~	3.1	13.9
17	Mak Feliciano (PHI)	4.7	2.0	0.1	~~0.1~~	~~0.1~~	~~0.1~~	3.6	10.4
18	Luk Chun Yin (HKG)	1.9	2.2	0.1	5.2	~~0.1~~	~~0.1~~	~~0.1~~	9.4

=== Final ===
Rank	Athlete	Run		Trick					Total
Rank	Athlete	1	2	1	2	3	4	5	Total
1st place, gold medalist(s)	Keyaki Ike (JPN)	7.3	~~6.2~~	~~0.1~~	7.8	8.9	7.1	~~0.1~~	31.1
2nd place, silver medalist(s)	Sanggoe Darma Tanjung (INA)	7.7	8.4	~~6.5~~	6.7	7.7	~~0.1~~	~~0.1~~	30.5
3rd place, bronze medalist(s)	Eun Ju-won (KOR)	6.0	4.4	~~0.1~~	~~0.1~~	6.4	~~0.1~~	8.6	25.4
4	Oat Athiwat (THA)	5.8	5.6	6.9	~~0.1~~	~~0.1~~	~~0.1~~	5.9	24.2
5	Aldwien Angkawidjaya (INA)	~~5.5~~	5.7	6.3	6.1	~~0.1~~	~~0.1~~	5.6	23.7
6	Petch Napat (THA)	3.6	2.9	6.7	7.1	~~0.1~~	~~0.1~~	~~0.1~~	20.3
7	Yaziru Amiru (MAS)	4.1	3.5	4.2	~~0.1~~	5.5	~~0.1~~	~~0.1~~	17.3
8	Gao Qunxiang (CHN)	4.7	5.4	0.1	~~0.1~~	5.5	~~0.1~~	~~0.1~~	15.7
