= Skateboarding at the 2018 Asian Games – Women's street =

Women's street at the 2018 Asian Games
- Venue: Jakabaring Sport City
- Date: 29 August 2018
- Competitors: 8 from 6 nations

Medalists
gold medal	Margielyn Didal	Philippines
silver medal	Kaya Isa	Japan
bronze medal	Bunga Nyimas	Indonesia

The women's street competition at the 2018 Asian Games took place on 29 August at the JSC Skateboard Stadium.

== Schedule ==
All times are Western Indonesia Time (UTC+07:00)

Date	Time	Event
Wednesday, 29 August 2018	11:00	Final

== Results ==
Rank	Athlete	Run		Trick					Total
Rank	Athlete	1	2	1	2	3	4	5	Total
1st place, gold medalist(s)	Margielyn Didal (PHI)	6.7	7.7	~~6.0~~	~~3.7~~	7.1	8.9	~~6.7~~	30.4
2nd place, silver medalist(s)	Kaya Isa (JPN)	5.9	7.4	~~0.1~~	~~0.1~~	5.5	6.2	~~0.1~~	25.0
3rd place, bronze medalist(s)	Bunga Nyimas (INA)	~~4.1~~	4.8	~~3.8~~	4.3	~~0.1~~	5.3	5.4	19.8
4	Zeng Wenhui (CHN)	4.8	3.9	3.6	~~2.9~~	~~0.1~~	3.6	~~0.1~~	15.9
5	Hui Zixuan (CHN)	3.1	3.5	4.1	~~0.1~~	4.4	~~0.1~~	~~0.1~~	15.1
6	Aliqqa Novvery (INA)	4.1	3.4	~~0.1~~	~~0.1~~	3.1	2.7	~~1.5~~	13.3
7	Chu Pei-yu (TPE)	3.4	2.8	0.1	~~0.1~~	~~0.1~~	~~0.1~~	1.7	8.0
8	Fatin Syahirah Roszizi (MAS)	2.0	2.0	0.1	~~0.1~~	1.3	~~0.1~~	~~0.1~~	5.4
