= Inline Speed Skating World Championships =

Inline Speed Skating Competition

- Status: Active
- Genre: Global sports event
- Date: c. November
- Frequency: Annual
- Inaugurated: 1937
- Organiser: World Skate

The Inline Speed Skating World Championships (World Roller Speed Skating Championships) are inline speed skating competitions sanctioned by World Skate. The World Championships have been held unofficially since 1937 and officially since 1966.

== History ==
European nations, in particular Italy, have dominated the competition in its first 40 years. The United States have had a stint of dominance during the 1980s, 90s and 2000s. In the 2010s, Colombia has been the dominant force in the championship, winning the general podium throughout the whole decade.

The championship has had many changes, but it has always focused mainly on road and track disciplines. In 1992, the introduction of inline skates caused a major technological impact after decades of using traditional quad skates.

Due to the Russian invasion of Ukraine, World Skate banned Russian and Belarusian athletes and officials from its competitions, and will not stage any events in Russia or Belarus in 2022.

== World Roller Speed Skating Championships ==
=== Unofficial ===
Number	Year	Road	Track	Country	City	Nations	Gold	Silver	Bronze
1	1937	*		Italy	Monza	Men Only	France		
2	1938	*		Italy	Ferrara	Men Only	France	Italy	
3	1938		*	United Kingdom	London	Men Only	Great Britain	Italy	Belgium
4	1948	*		Italy	Monfalcone	Men Only	Italy		
5	1949	*		Italy	Ferrara	Men Only	Italy		
6	1949		*	Portugal	Lisbon	Men Only	Belgium		
7	1951	*		Italy	Monfalcone	Men Only	Italy		
8	1953	*		Italy	Venice-Lido		Italy		
9	1954		*	Italy	Bari		Italy		
10	1956		*	Spain	Barcelona		Italy		
11	1957	*		Italy	Palermo		Italy	France	
12	1958	*		Italy	Finale Ligure		Italy		
13	1960	*		Belgium	Wetteren		Italy		
14	1961		*	Spain	Voltrega		Italy		
15	1961	*		France	Gujan Mestras		Italy	West Germany	
16	1962		*	Italy	Venice-Lido		Italy		
17	1963	*		France	Nantes		Italy	Great Britain	
18	1964	*		Spain	Madrid		Belgium	Italy	
19	1965	*		Belgium	Wetteren		Belgium	West Germany	
20	1965		*	Italy	Siracusa		Italy	Belgium	
21	1966	*		Argentina	Mar del Plata	Men Only		Argentina	Belgium
22	1967		*	Spain	Barcelona	Women Only	Spain		
23	1968	*		Italy	Alte Montecchio		Italy	Spain	New Zealand
24	1969		*	Argentina	Mar del Plata	Men Only	Italy; New Zealand		West Germany
25	1975		*	Argentina	Mar del Plata	Men Only	Italy	Argentina	
26	1975	*		Italy	Sesto San Giovanni		Italy	Belgium	New Zealand
27	1978		*	Argentina	Mar del Plata		Italy	New Zealand	
28	1979	*	*	Italy	Como/Finale Emilia		Italy	Belgium	Argentina
29	1980	*	*	New Zealand	Masterton		Italy	United States	
30	1981	*	*	Belgium	Leuven/Ostende		United States	Italy	Belgium
31	1982	*	*	Italy	Finale Emilia		Italy	United States	
32	1983		*	Argentina	Mar del Plata		United States	Italy	Argentina
33	1984	*		Colombia	Bogota		Italy	United States	France
34	1985		*	United States	Colorado Springs		United States	Italy	
35	1986	*		Australia	Adelaide		Italy		
36	1987		*	France	Grenoble		Italy	United States	France
37	1988	*		Italy	Cassano d´Adda		Italy	United States	

=== Official ===
Number	Year	Road	Track	Country	City	Nations	Gold	Silver	Bronze
38	1989		*	New Zealand	Hastings		Italy	United States	Argentina
39	1990	*		Colombia	Bello	14	Italy	ColombiaUnited States	
40	1991		*	Belgium	Ostende		United States	Italy	Argentina
41	1992	*		Italy	Roma		United States	Netherlands	Italy
42	1993		*	United States	Colorado Springs		United States	Italy	Australia
43	1994	*	*	France	Gujan Mestras		United States	Argentina	Australia
44	1995	*	*	Australia	Perth		United States	Italy	Australia
45	1996	*	*	Italy	Padua/Scaltenigo		United States	Italy	France
46	1997	*	*	Argentina	Mar del Plata		United States	Italy	Argentina
47	1998	*	*	Spain	Pamplona		United States	Italy	Argentina
48	1999	*	*	Chile	Santiago		United States	Italy	Spain
49	2000	*	*	Colombia	Barrancabermeja	31	United States	Colombia	Italy
50	2001	*	*	France	Valence d'Agen		United States	France	Spain
51	2002		*	Belgium	Ostend		United States	Italy	Colombia
52	2003	*	*	Venezuela	Barquisimeto		United States	Italy	Argentina
53	2004	*	*	Italy	L'Aquila	39	Colombia	Italy	United States
54	2005	*	*	China	Suzhou	31	Colombia	Italy	France
55	2006	*	*	South Korea	Anyang	46	Colombia	United States	New Zealand
56	2007	*	*	Colombia	Cali	42	United States	Colombia	South Korea
57	2008	*	*	Spain	Gijon	57	Colombia	United States	South Korea
58	2009	*	*	China	Haining Official Website	42	United States	Colombia	South Korea
59	2010	*	*	Colombia	Guarne	34	Colombia	United States	Belgium
60	2011	*	*	South Korea	Yeosu Official Website		Colombia	South Korea	Chinese Taipei
61	2012	*	*	Italy	Ascoli Piceno	34	Colombia	Italy	Belgium
62	2013	*	*	Belgium	Ostend	51	Colombia	Italy	Belgium
63	2014	*	*	Argentina	Rosario	50	Colombia	France	Chinese Taipei
64	2015	*	*	Chinese Taipei	Kaohsiung	41	Colombia	France	South Korea
65	2016	*	*	China	Nanjing		Colombia	France	Italy
66	2017	*	*	China	Nanjing		Colombia	Italy	Spain
67	2018	*	*	Netherlands	Arnhem		Colombia	Germany	France
68	2019	*	*	Spain	Barcelona		Colombia	Belgium	Italy
69	2021	*	*	Colombia	Ibagué		Colombia	France	Chinese Taipei
70	2022	*	*	Argentina	Buenos Aires		Colombia	Chinese Taipei	France
71	2023	*	*	Italy	Montecchio Maggiore / Vicenza		Colombia	Belgium	Italy
72	2024	*	*	Italy	Montesilvano / Sulmona – Pescara		Colombia	Italy	Belgium
73	2025	*	*	China	Beidaihe		Colombia	Chinese Taipei	Spain

== All-time medal table ==
Status after the 2025 Inline Speed Skating World Championships

Rank	Country	Gold	Silver	Bronze	Total
1	Colombia	230	198	125	553
2	United States	209	123	77	409
3	Italy	116	133	138	387
4	France	55	83	102	240
5	Argentina	31	40	70	141
6	Spain	29	27	19	75
7	Belgium	28	22	27	77
8	Chinese Taipei	21	34	41	96
9	South Korea	21	31	48	100
10	New Zealand	21	25	25	71
11	Germany	14	19	29	62
12	Australia	13	25	38	76
13	Chile	7	16	19	42
14	Netherlands	7	9	11	27
15	China	5	14	16	35
16	Venezuela	3	6	7	16
17	Ecuador	3	5	9	17
18	India	2	0	1	3
19	Mexico	1	3	6	10
20	Austria	1	0	1	2
20	El Salvador	1	0	1	2
22	Sweden	0	2	1	3
23	Paraguay	0	1	2	3
23	Portugal	0	1	2	3
25	Guatemala	0	1	1	2
26	Japan	0	1	0	1
27	Switzerland	0	0	1	1

== See also ==
- Inline Speed Skating World Junior Championships
- World Inline Cup
- European Inline Speed Skating Championships
