= Bunga Nyimas =

Indonesian skateboarder (born 2006)

Personal information
- Full name: Bunga Nyimas Cinta
- Nationality: Indonesian
- Born: 13 April 2006 (age 20) Indonesia
- Height: 148 cm (4 ft 10 in)
- Weight: 31 kg (68 lb)

Sport
- Country: Indonesia
- Sport: Skateboarding
- Style: Street
Medal record
Women's skateboarding
Representing Indonesia
Event	1st	2nd	3rd
Asian Games	0	0	1
Southeast Asian Games	0	1	1
Total	0	1	2
Asian Games
Bronze medal – third place	2018 Jakarta–Palembang	Street
Southeast Asian Games
Silver medal – second place	2019 Philippines	Park
Bronze medal – third place	2019 Philippines	Game of skate

Bunga Nyimas Cinta (born 13 April 2006) is an Indonesian skateboarder who has competed in the Asian Games. She became the youngest medalist in the 2018 Asian Games at age 12 when she won bronze in the women's street event behind gold medalist Margielyn Didal of the Philippines and silver medalist Kaya Isa of Japan.

She first became a follower of skateboarding as a second grader, watching videos related to the discipline on social media. In her fifth grade, Bunga Nyimas started taking skateboarding seriously. She initially aspired to become a doctor but decided to pursue a professional career in skateboarding.

On 2020, Mattel appoints Nyimas to be the first Barbie role model from Indonesia.
