= Vikram Ingale =

Indian speed skater (born 1993)

Personal information
- Full name: Vikram Rajendra Ingale
- Nationality: Indian
- Born: 14 September 1993 (age 32) Kolhapur, Maharashtra, India

Sport
- Sport: Roller sports
- Event: Inline speed skating
Medal record
Men's inline speed skating
Representing India
Asian Games
Bronze medal – third place	2022 Hangzhou	3000m team relay

Vikram Rajendra Ingale (born 14 September 1993) is an Indian speed skater. He was in the Indian speed skating team for the 2022 Asian Games that won the bronze medal in the men's 3000m event along with Siddhant Kamble and Anandkumar Velkumar.

== Early life ==
Ingale hails from Kolhapur, born to Jyoti R and Rajendra Ingale. He began speed skating after watching his older sister partaking in the sport.

== Career ==
He won the Indian National Championships four times. He also won two bronze medals at the Asian Championships in Lishui, China.

== Awards ==
He won the Shiv Chhatrapati Award given by the Maharashtra Government.
