= Avani Panchal =

Medal record

Representing India

Asian Games
Bronze medal – third place	2010 Guangzhou	Pairs Skating

Avani Bharat Kumar Panchal (born 31 August 1991) is an Indian figure and roller skater. She hails from Vishakapatnam, Andhra Pradesh. She won a bronze medal at 2010 Asian Games held in Guangzhou, China in Pairs Skating with her partner Anup Kumar Yama.

== Education ==
Avani has a Bachelor of Technology(B.Tech) degree from Andhra University. She studied Computer Science and Engineering in Anil Neerukonda Institute of Technology and Sciences (ANITS), Sangivalasa in Vishakapatnam. She graduated in 2013. She completed her Master’s degree in Information Systems Technology- Technology Project Management from Wilmington University, Delaware in 2018.
