= Anup Kumar Yama =

Indian skater

Medal record

Representing India

Asian Games
Bronze medal – third place	2010 Guangzhou	Pairs Skating
Bronze medal – third place	2010 Guangzhou	Men's Single Free Skating

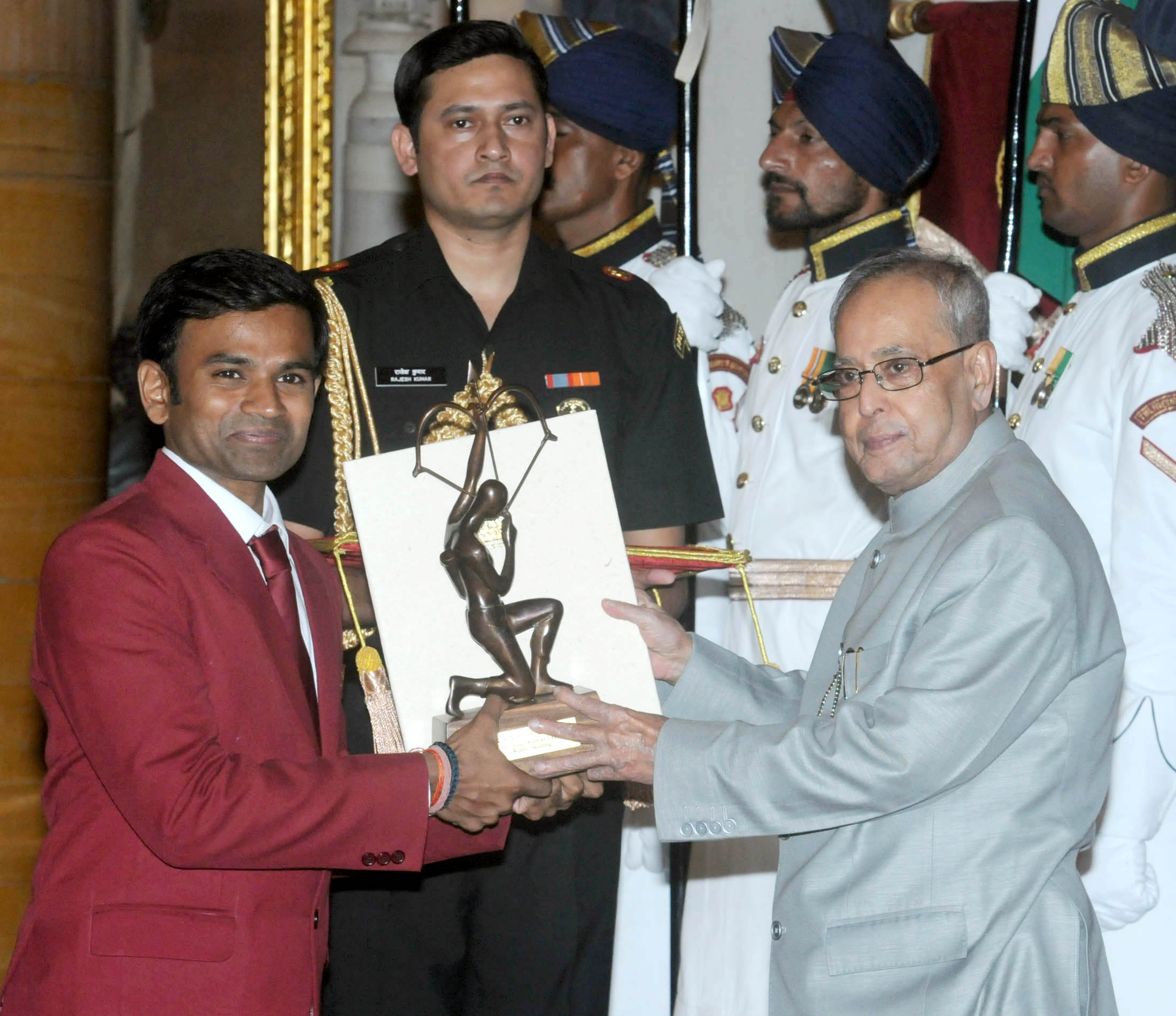
The President, Shri Pranab Mukherjee presenting the Arjuna Award for the year-2015 to Shri Anup Kumar Yama for Roller Skating, in a glittering ceremony, at Rashtrapati Bhavan, in New Delhi on 29 August 2015

Anup Kumar Yama (born 1 September 1984) is an Indian figure and roller skater. He won the Arjuna Award in 2015 by Indian Government (for outstanding achievement in National Sports). He has won several national titles.

He won two bronze medals at the 2010 Asian Games held in Guangzhou, China in the Men's Single Free Skating and Pairs Skating events with his partner Avani Panchal.

== Early life ==
He was born on 1 September 1984 in a family of athletes.

Anup started skating at four. He is coached by his father Veeresh Yama, also a skater.

== Achievements ==
=== Achievements at the National Level ===
- 1 gold medal in Freestyle Artistic Skating at the All India National Competition, Bangalore, 1989.
- 2 gold medals in Freestyle and Pair Artistic Skating at the National Championship, Patiala-Punjab, 1991.
- 3 gold medals in Freestyle, Figure and Pair Artistic Skating at the National Championship, Patiala-Punjab, 1992.
- 3 gold medals in Freestyle, Figure and Pair Artistic Skating at the National Championship, Trivendrum-Kerala, 1993.
- 3 gold medals in Freestyle, Figure and Pair Artistic Skating at the National Championship, Patiala-Punjab, 1994.
- 1 gold medal, 1 silver medal and 1 bronze medal at the National Championship, Kolkata, 1995.
- 1 gold medal in Freestyle Artistic Skating at the National Championship, Patiala-Punjab, 1996.
- 1 silver medal in Freestyle Artistic at the National Championship, Pune, 1997.
- 1 gold medal in Freestyle Artistic at the National Championship, Visakhapatnam, 1998.
- 1 gold medal in Freestyle and Figure Artistic Championship respectively at the National Championship, Faridabad, 2000.
- 2 gold medals for Freestyle and Figure Artistic Championship at the National Championship, Visakhapatnam, 2001.
- 2 gold medals for Freestyle and Figure Artistic Championship at the National Championship, Visakhapatnam, 2002.
- 2 gold medals for Freestyle and Figure and a silver medal in pair skating at the NATIONAL GAMES, 2002.
- 3 gold medals for Freestyle, Figure and Pair Artistic Skating at the National Championship, Faridabad, 2004.
- 2 gold medals for Freestyle and Figure Artistic Skating at the National Championship, Kolkata, 2005.
- 3 gold medals for Freestyle, Figure and Pair Artistic Skating at the National Championship, Visakhapatnam, 2006.
- 4 gold medals for Freestyle, Figure, Pair and Solo Dance Artistic Skating at the National Championship, Visakhapatnam, 2008.
- 5 gold medals for Freestyle, Figure, Pair, Solo Dance and Inline Artistic Skating at the National Championship, Visakhapatnam, 2009.
- 6 gold medals for Freestyle, Figure, Pair, Combined, Solo Dance and Inline Artistic Skating at the National Championship, Visakhapatnam, 2010.
- 7 gold medals for Freestyle, Figure, Pair, Combined, Solo Dance, Pair dance and Inline Artistic Skating at the National Championship, 2011.
- 8 gold medals for Freestyle, Figure, Pair, Combined, Solo Dance, Pair dance, Show Group and Inline Artistic Skating at the National Championship, 2012.
- 7 gold medals for Freestyle, Figure, Pair, Combined, Solo Dance, Pair dance, and Inline Artistic Skating at the National Championship, 2013.

=== Achievements at the Asian Level ===
- Participated in the 8th Asian Roller Skating Championship, 1999. (Jinshan – China)
- 1 bronze medal in Freestyle Artistic Skating at the 9th Asian Roller Skating Championship, 2001. (Taitung -Taiwan)
- 2 bronze medals for Combined and Pair Artistic Skating at the 10th Asian Roller Skating Championship, 2004. (Akita – Japan)
- 2 bronze medals in Figure and Pair Skating and a silver medal in Combined Artistic Skating at the 11th Asian Roller Skating Championship, 2005. (Jeonju – Korea)
- 1 gold medal in Pair Skating, 1 silver in Combined and 1 bronze in Freestyle Artistic Skating at the 12th Asian Roller Skating Championship, 2006. (Kaohsiung -Taiwan)
- 3 gold medals in Quad Freestyle, Inline Freestyle and Combined and 2 bronze medals in Figure and Pair Dance Skating at the 13th Asian Roller Skating Championship, 2008. (Haining -China)
- 1 gold medal in Inline Artistic Skating, 1 silver in Combined and bronze in Pair Artistic Skating at the 14th Asian Roller Skating Championship, 2010. (Kaohsiung -Taiwan)
- 2 bronze medals at the 2010 Asian Games. (Guangzhou – China)
- 3 gold medals in Quad Freestyle, Figure and Combined and 2 silver medals in Inline Freestyle and Solo dance at the 15th Asian Roller Skating Championship, 2012 (Hefei-China)

=== Achievement at the World Level ===
- 1 bronze medal in 2012 Inline Artistic Roller Skating World Championship at New Zealand
