= Skateboarding at the 2026 Asian Games =

- Venue: Aichi International Exhibition Center
- Dates: 24–27 September 2026
- Competitors: 56 from 11 nations

The skateboarding competitions at the 2026 Asian Games was held between 24 and 27 September 2026 at the Aichi International Exhibition Center, Hall B.

Four medal events were held, The Park and Street events for both genders.

== Schedule ==
P	Preliminary	F	Final

Event↓/Date →	24th Thu	25th Fri	26th Sat	27th Sun
Men's park	P	F		
Men's street			P	F
Women's park	P	F		
Women's street			P	F

== Medalists ==
Event	Gold	Silver	Bronze
Men's park	Izuru Nagahara; Japan	Ku Yong-yan; Chinese Taipei	Gunjo Shiji; Japan
Men's street	Kang Jun-i; South Korea	Toa Sasaki; Japan	Ginwoo Onodera; Japan
Women's park	Mizuho Hasegawa; Japan	Lin Yi-fan; Chinese Taipei	Misugu Okamoto; Japan
Women's street	Zhu Yuanling; China	Yumeka Oda; Japan	Cui Chenxi; China

== Medal table ==
Rank	Nation	Gold	Silver	Bronze	Total
1	Japan (JPN)	2	2	3	7
2	China (CHN)	1	0	1	2
3	South Korea (KOR)	1	0	0	1
4	Chinese Taipei (TPE)	0	2	0	2
Totals (4 entries)		4	4	4	12

== Participating nations ==
A total of 56 athletes from 11 nations competed in skateboarding at the 2026 Asian Games:

- China (8)
- Chinese Taipei (2)
- Hong Kong (5)
- Indonesia (7)
- Iran (1)
- Japan (8)
- Kazakhstan (3)
- Nepal (2)
- Philippines (5)
- South Korea (8)
- Thailand (7)
