= South Korea at the 2026 Asian Games =

- IOC code: KOR
- NOC: Korean Sport & Olympic Committee

in Aichi–Nagoya, Japan September 19 – October 4, 2026
- Competitors: 792 in 50 sports
- Officials: 260
- Medals Ranked 3rd: Gold 39 Silver 43 Bronze 68 Total 150

Asian Games appearances (overview)
- 1954; 1958; 1962; 1966; 1970; 1974; 1978; 1982; 1986; 1990; 1994; 1998; 2002; 2006; 2010; 2014; 2018; 2022; 2026

South Korea competed at the 2026 Asian Games, held in Nagoya, Aichi Prefecture, Japan from September 19 to October 4, 2026.

== Competitors ==
The following is a list of the number of competitors representing South Korea who participated at the Asian Games:

Sport	Men	Women	Total
Archery	6	6	12
Artistic swimming	0	3	3
Athletics	24	18	42
Badminton	10	10	20
Baseball	24	0	24
Basketball	12	12	24
3x3 basketball	4	4	8
Boxing	6	5	11
Breaking	2	2	4
Canoeing	9	5	11
Cycling	18	16	34
Diving	4	4	8
Equestrian	12	0	12
Esports	35	1	36
Fencing	12	12	24
Field hockey	20	20	40
Football	23	23	46
Golf	3	3	6
Gymnastics	5	12	17
Handball	16	16	32
Ju-jitsu	10	6	16
Judo	9	9	18
Kabaddi	12	0	12
Karate	3	3	6
Kurash	3	4	7
Mixed martial arts	2	1	3
Modern pentathlon	4	4	8
Rowing	10	6	16
Rugby sevens	13	0	13
Sailing	8	5	13
Sepak takraw	12	12	24
Shooting	15	15	30
Skateboarding	4	4	8
Soft tennis	5	5	10
Softball	0	17	17
Sport climbing	5	5	10
Squash	4	4	8
Surfing	2	2	4
Swimming	15	11	26
Table tennis	5	5	10
Taekwondo	5	5	10
Tennis	6	6	6
Teqball	3	1	4
Triathlon	3	3	6
Volleyball	12	12	24
Beach volleyball	4	4	8
Water polo	14	0	14
Weightlifting	5	5	10
Wrestling	12	6	18
Wushu	8	5	13
Total	457	335	792

== Archery ==
Men

Athlete	Event	Ranking round		Round of 64	Round of 32	Round of 16	Quarterfinals	Semifinals	Final / BM	
Athlete	Event	Score	Seed	Opposition Score	Opposition Score	Opposition Score	Opposition Score	Opposition Score	Opposition Score	Rank
Kim Je-deok	Individual recurve	693	2	Bye	Quik (MAS); W 6–0	Chauhan (IND); L 4–6	Did not advance			
Kim Woo-jin	Individual recurve	684	6	Did not advance						
Lee Woo-seok	Individual recurve	687	4	Bye	Alif (BAN); W 6–2	Shabani (IRI); W 6–5	Tshering (BHU); W 7–1	Bommadevara (IND); W 7–3	Nakanishi (JPN); W 6–2	1st place, gold medalist(s)
Choi Eun-gyu	Individual compound	706	10	—N/a	Did not advance					
Choi Yong-hee	Individual compound	711	3	—N/a	Almansoori (UAE); W 147–141	Ghazali (MAS); W 149–145	Dang (VIE); L 143–146	Did not advance		
Kim Jong-ho	Individual compound	706	8	—N/a	Gaytshey (BHU); W 148–143	Mazuki (MAS); W 147–145	Liao (CHN); W 143–142	Thirumuru (IND); W 148–144	Chang (TPE); W 149–145	1st place, gold medalist(s)
Kim Je-deok; Kim Woo-jin; Lee Woo-seok	Team recurve	2064	1	—N/a	Bye	Tajikistan; W 6–0	Mongolia; W 5–3	Chinese Taipei; W 6–0	India; W 5–1	1st place, gold medalist(s)
Choi Eun-gyu; Choi Yong-hee; Kim Jong-ho	Team compound	2123	2	—N/a		Bye	Iran; W 239–234	India; L 229–236	Chinese Taipei; L 233–234	4

Women

Athlete	Event	Ranking round		Round of 64	Round of 32	Round of 16	Quarterfinals	Semifinals	Final / BM	
Athlete	Event	Score	Seed	Opposition Score	Opposition Score	Opposition Score	Opposition Score	Opposition Score	Opposition Score	Rank
Kang Chae-young	Individual recurve	685	1	Bye	Jongkraijak (THA); W 7–1	Kirti (IND); W 7–3	Mohod (IND); L 4–6	Did not advance		
Lee Yun-ji	Individual recurve	677	4	Did not advance						
Oh Ye-jin	Individual recurve	678	3	Bye	Al-Saei (QAT); W 6–0	Octavia (INA); W 7–3	Hsu (TPE); W 6–4	Huang (CHN); W 7–3	Mohod (IND); L 5–6	2nd place, silver medalist(s)
Kang Yeon-seo	Individual compound	701	4	Bye	Dagdanjav (MGL); W 150–133	Surekha (IND); W 150–146	Wunier (CHN); W 145–140	Ashrifah (INA); L 143–147	Park J-y (KOR); W 145–143	3rd place, bronze medalist(s)
Park Jung-yoon	Individual compound	702	3	Bye	Alnajjar (UAE); W 148–140	Chen F-y (TPE); W 148–147	Mat Salleh (MAS); W 145–139	Cojuangco (PHI); L 141–142	Kang Y-s (KOR); L 143–145	4
Park Ye-rin	Individual compound	693	24	Did not advance						
Kang Chae-young; Lee Yun-ji; Oh Ye-jin	Team recurve	2040	1	—N/a		Bye	Kazakhstan; W 5–3	Indonesia; W 6–0	India; L 3–5	2nd place, silver medalist(s)
Kang Yeon-seo; Park Jung-yoon; Park Ye-rin	Team compound	2096	3	—N/a		United Arab Emirates; W 234–225	Thailand; W 230–230	India; L 233–234	Chinese Taipei; W 229–228	3rd place, bronze medalist(s)

Mixed

Athlete	Event	Ranking round		Round of 32	Round of 16	Quarterfinals	Semifinals	Final / BM	
Athlete	Event	Score	Seed	Opposition Score	Opposition Score	Opposition Score	Opposition Score	Opposition Score	Rank
Kang Chae-young; Kim Je-deok	Mixed team recurve	1378	1	Bye	Qatar; W 6–0	Mongolia; W 5–3	China; L 0–6	Japan; W 5–1	3rd place, bronze medalist(s)
Park Jung-yoon; Choi Yong-hee	Mixed team compound	1413	3	—N/a	Japan; W 160–150	Iran; W 158–158	China; W 159–156	India; L 157–157	2nd place, silver medalist(s)

== Athletics ==
Track and road events
Men

Athlete	Event	Heat		Semifinal		Final	
Athlete	Event	Time	Rank	Time	Rank	Time	Rank
Joeljin Nwamadi	100 m	10.23	1 Q	10.17	1 Q	10.17	4
Daniel Biwesa	100 m	10.23	2 Q	10.22	3 q	10.19	5
Lee Jae-seong	200 m	21.42	4 Q	DNF	—	Did not advance	
Nwamadi Joel-jin	200 m	DNF	—	Did not advance			
Shin Min-kyu	400 m	46.39	5	—N/a		Did not advance	
Bae Geon-yul	400 m	47.04	7	—N/a		Did not advance	
Park Jong-hak	1500 m	3:46.28	6 Q	—N/a		3:46.87	10
Lee Jae-ung	1500 m	3:46.44	6 Q	—N/a		3:40.11	7
Park Jae-woo	5000 m	—N/a				14:09.69	10
Park Jae-woo	10000 m	—N/a				30:32.62	7
Park Won-been	3000 m steeplechase	—N/a				8:48.30	5
Seo Min-jun; Joeljin Nwamadi; Lee Jae-seong; Daniel Biwesa; Kim Si-on^{h}	4 × 100 m relay	39.33	4 q	—N/a		38.43	3rd place, bronze medalist(s)
Jang Min-ho; Shin Min-kyu; Bae Geon-yul; Seo Min-jun; Lee Jae-ung^{h}	4 × 400 m relay	3:07.19	5 q	—N/a		3:06.59	6
Park Min-ho	Marathon	—N/a				2:15:35	8
Kim Hong-rok	Marathon	—N/a				2:18:27	10
Choe Byeong-gwang	Half marathon race walk	—N/a				1:28:35	3rd place, bronze medalist(s)
Joo Hyun-myeong	Marathon race walk	—N/a				3:14:31	5

Women

Athlete	Event	Heat		Semifinal		Final	
Athlete	Event	Time	Rank	Time	Rank	Time	Rank
Seo Ji-hyun	100 m	11.83	3 Q	11.85	8	Did not advance	
Kim Ju-ha	100 m	11.73	3 Q	11.68	6	Did not advance	
Kim Seo-yoon	400 m	53.81	3 q	—N/a		53.38	4
Lee A-young	400 m	54.74	6	—N/a		Did not advance	
Park Na-yeon	800 m	2:05.94	5	—N/a		Did not advance	
Park Na-yeon	1500 m	—N/a				4:14.96	5
Kim Yu-jin	1500 m	—N/a				4:22.89	9
Kim Yu-jin	5000 m	—N/a				16:09.60	10
Jo Ha-rim	10000 m	—N/a				34:34.66	8
Jo Ha-rim	3000 m steeplechase	—N/a				10:26.06	8
Kim Myeong-ji; Kim Ju-ha; Seo Ji-hyun; Kim Seo-yoon	4 × 100 m relay	44.94	5 q	—N/a		44.81	7
Choi Kyung-sun	Marathon	—N/a				2:41:31	12
Lim Ye-jin	Marathon	—N/a				2:58:16	16
Lee Se-ha	Half marathon race walk	—N/a				1:42:28	5

Mixed

Athlete	Event	Heat		Final	
Athlete	Event	Time	Rank	Time	Rank
Seo Min-jun; Seo Ji-hyun; Kim Si-on; Kim Ju-ha	4 × 100 m relay	DNF	—	Did not advance	
Jang Min-ho; Kim Seo-yoon; Shin Min-kyu; Lee A-young	4 × 400 m relay	3:18.66	4 q	3:19.18	6

^{h} Athletes who participated in the heats only.

Field events
Men

Athlete	Event	Final	
Athlete	Event	Result	Rank
Woo Sang-hyeok	High jump	2.22	3rd place, bronze medalist(s)
Kim Jang-woo	Triple jump	16.50	4
Kim Dong-hyuk	Triple jump	15.58	10
Park Si-hoon	Shot put	17.97	12
Lee Ywun-chul	Hammer throw	68.35	8
Nam Tae-poong	Javelin throw	75.10	8

Women

Athlete	Event	Final	
Athlete	Event	Result	Rank
Shin Soo-young	Pole vault	3.65	8
Jeong Yu-sun	Shot put	16.78	4
Jeong Ye-lim	Discus throw	55.28	6
Shin Yu-jin	Discus throw	52.02	7
Kim Tae-hui	Hammer throw	61.48	9
Lee Yu-ra	Hammer throw	57.19	10

Combined events
Men

Athlete	Event	Category	100 m	LJ	SP	HJ	400 m	110H	DT	PV	JT	1,500 m	Total	Rank
Lee Yu-seong	Decathlon	Result	10.81	6.71	11.00	1.76	49.17	15.54	30.82	4.50	41.75	4:41.84	6804	9
Lee Yu-seong	Decathlon	Points	903	746	546	593	853	785	481	760	468	669	6804	9
Park Jun-young	Decathlon	Result	11.38	6.64	11.78	1.85	51.80	15.78	34.11	4.00	54.17	5:01.09	6629	10
Park Jun-young	Decathlon	Points	778	729	593	670	734	758	546	617	651	553	6629	10

== Badminton ==
Men

Athlete	Event	Round of 64	Round of 32	Round of 16	Quarter-finals	Semi-finals	Final	
Athlete	Event	Opposition Score	Opposition Score	Opposition Score	Opposition Score	Opposition Score	Opposition Score	Rank
Choi Ji-hoon	Singles	Bye	Li (CHN); W 18–21, 21–19, 21–18	Ng (HKG); L 21–18, 14–21, 1–3 retired	Did not advance			
Yoo Tae-bin	Singles	Bye	Lin (TPE); W 21–10, 21–12	Shi (CHN); W 21–17, 25–23	Naraoka (JPN); W 12–21, 21–5, 21–11	Loh (SGP); L 19–21, 21–19, 12–21	Did not advance	3rd place, bronze medalist(s)
Kang Min-hyuk; Ki Dong-ju	Doubles	—N/a	Nibal / Shaheed (MDV); W 21–3, 21–6	Koh / Kubo (SGP); W 21–14, 21–12	Alfian / Fikri (INA); L 14–21, 22–20, 14–21	Did not advance		
Kim Won-ho; Seo Seung-jae	Doubles	—N/a	Bye	Chia / Tee (MAS); W 21–19, 21–16	Kumagai / Nishi (JPN); W 15–21, 21–17, 21–15	Carnando / Marthin (INA); L 11–21, 14–21	Did not advance	3rd place, bronze medalist(s)
Choi Ji-hoon; Jeon Hyeok-jin; Jo Song-hyun; Kang Min-hyuk; Ki Dong-ju; Kim Jae-hyeon; Kim Won-ho; Park Sang-yong; Seo Seung-jae; Yoo Tae-bin	Team	—N/a		Hong Kong (HKG); W 3–1	China (CHN); L 2–3	Did not advance		

Women

Athlete	Event	Round of 64	Round of 32	Round of 16	Quarter-finals	Semi-finals	Final	
Athlete	Event	Opposition Score	Opposition Score	Opposition Score	Opposition Score	Opposition Score	Opposition Score	Rank
An Se-young	Singles	Bye	Smagulova (KAZ); W 21–5, 21–5	Liyanage (SRI); W 21–9, 21–10	Intanon (THA); W 21–8, 21–9	Chen (CHN); W 21–5, 21–12	Yamaguchi (JPN); W 21–17, 21–9	1st place, gold medalist(s)
Kim Ga-eun	Singles	Bye	Akter (BAN); W 21–4, 21–5	Wang (CHN); L 14–21, 6–11 retired	Did not advance			
Baek Ha-na; Lee So-hee	Doubles	—N/a	Bye	Kusuma / Puspita Sari (INA); W 21–16, 15–21, 21–9	Hsu / Lin (TPE); W 22–20, 21–17	Nakanishi / Uesaka (JPN); W 21–13, 21–12	Liu / Tan (CHN); W 26–28, 21–18, 21–18	1st place, gold medalist(s)
Kim Hye-jeong; Lee Yeon-woo	Doubles	—N/a	Maharjan / Sherchan (NEP); W 21–3, 21–5	Liu / Tan (CHN); L 21–19, 9–21, 18–21	Did not advance			
An Se-young; Baek Ha-na; Jang Ha-jeong; Jeong Na-eun; Kim Ga-eun; Kim Ga-ram; Kim Hye-jeong; Lee So-hee; Lee Yeon-woo; Sim Yu-jin	Team	—N/a		Bye	Malaysia (MAS); W 3–1	Japan (JPN); L 1–3	Did not advance	3rd place, bronze medalist(s)

Mixed

Athlete	Event	Round of 32	Round of 16	Quarter-finals	Semi-finals	Final	
Athlete	Event	Opposition Score	Opposition Score	Opposition Score	Opposition Score	Opposition Score	Rank
Jo Song-hyun; Jeong Na-eun	Doubles	Khanal / Sherchan (NEP); W 21–5, 21–6	Trần / Phạm (VIE); W 21–9, 21–17	Syahnawi / Marwah (INA); L 9–21, 21–12, 19–21	Did not advance		
Kim Jae-hyeon; Jang Ha-jeong	Doubles	Larosh / Shahzad (PAK); W 21–1, 21–10	Chen / Cheng (MAS); W 21–16, 20–22, 21–19	Jiang / Wei (CHN); L 13–21, 15–21	Did not advance		

== Baseball ==
Team	Event	Preliminary round				Super round			Final	
Team	Event	Opposition Score	Opposition Score	Opposition Score	Rank	Opposition Score	Opposition Score	Rank	Opposition Score	Rank
South Korea men's	Men's tournament	Chinese Taipei; W 5–0	Hong Kong; W 13–0	Thailand; W 18–1	1 Q	Japan; L 0–5	China; W 9–2	2 Q	Japan; W 3–1	1st place, gold medalist(s)

Team squad

- Bae Chan-seung
- Cho Hyeong-woo
- Choi Jun-yong
- Choi Min-seok
- Gwak Been
- Jeong Jun-jae
- Jo Byeong-hyeon
- Kim Do-yeong
- Kim Geon-hee
- Kim Ji-chan
- Kim Jin-uk
- Kim Ju-won
- Kim Young-woo
- Lee Jae-hyeon
- Moon Bo-gyeong
- Moon Hyun-bin
- Oh Won-seok
- Park Jae-hyun
- Park Jun-soon
- Park Yeong-hyun
- Roh Si-hwan
- So Hyeong-jun
- Sung Yeong-tak
- Yoon Dong-hee

Preliminary round – Group B

Pos	Team	Pld	W	L	RF	RA	PCT	GB	Qualification
1	South Korea	3	3	0	36	1	1.000	—	Super round
2	Chinese Taipei	3	2	1	26	5	.667	1	Super round
3	Thailand	3	1	2	11	40	.333	2	Placement round
4	Hong Kong	3	0	3	7	34	.000	3	Placement round

21 September; 18:30	Chinese Taipei	0–5	South Korea	Okazaki Municipal Baseball Stadium, Okazaki; Attendance: 3,168; Umpires: Masaoki Ichiki (JPN)
21 September; 18:30	LP: Lin Yi-Wei	Boxscore	WP: Gwak Been	Okazaki Municipal Baseball Stadium, Okazaki; Attendance: 3,168; Umpires: Masaoki Ichiki (JPN)
21 September; 18:30		Boxscore	HR: Yoon Dong-hee	Okazaki Municipal Baseball Stadium, Okazaki; Attendance: 3,168; Umpires: Masaoki Ichiki (JPN)

22 September; 18:30	South Korea	13–0	Hong Kong	Toyohashi Municipal Baseball Stadium, Toyohashi; Attendance: 1,277; Umpires: Chieh Hsu (TPE)
22 September; 18:30	WP: Kim Jin-uk	Boxscore	LP: Mok Chun Pui	Toyohashi Municipal Baseball Stadium, Toyohashi; Attendance: 1,277; Umpires: Chieh Hsu (TPE)
22 September; 18:30	HR: Roh Si-hwan, Cho Hyeong-woo	Boxscore		Toyohashi Municipal Baseball Stadium, Toyohashi; Attendance: 1,277; Umpires: Chieh Hsu (TPE)

23 September; 12:00	Thailand	1–18 (F/5)	South Korea	Okazaki Municipal Baseball Stadium, Okazaki; Attendance: 520; Umpires: Guan Leyu (CHN)
23 September; 12:00	LP: Alexander Clark	Boxscore	WP: Oh Won-seok	Okazaki Municipal Baseball Stadium, Okazaki; Attendance: 520; Umpires: Guan Leyu (CHN)
23 September; 12:00		Boxscore	HR: Park Jae-hyun, Moon Bo-gyeong, Park Jun-soon	Okazaki Municipal Baseball Stadium, Okazaki; Attendance: 520; Umpires: Guan Leyu (CHN)

Super round

Pos	Team	Pld	W	L	RF	RA	PCT	GB	Qualification
1	Japan	3	3	0	23	6	1.000	—	Gold medal game
2	South Korea	3	2	1	14	7	.667	1	Gold medal game
3	Chinese Taipei	3	1	2	12	13	.333	2	Bronze medal game
4	China	3	0	3	6	29	.000	3	Bronze medal game

25 September; 18:30	South Korea	0–5	Japan	Toyohashi Municipal Baseball Stadium, Toyohashi; Attendance: 2,759; Umpires: Chieh Hsu (TPE)
25 September; 18:30	LP: So Hyeong-jun	Boxscore	WP: Shin Higuchi	Toyohashi Municipal Baseball Stadium, Toyohashi; Attendance: 2,759; Umpires: Chieh Hsu (TPE)

26 September; 18:30	China	2–9	South Korea	Toyohashi Municipal Baseball Stadium, Toyohashi; Attendance: 1,100; Umpires: Chen Te-jung (TPE)
26 September; 18:30	LP: Wu Anjun	Boxscore	WP: Choi Min-seok	Toyohashi Municipal Baseball Stadium, Toyohashi; Attendance: 1,100; Umpires: Chen Te-jung (TPE)

Gold medal match

27 September; 18:30	South Korea	3–1	Japan	Toyohashi Municipal Baseball Stadium, Toyohashi; Attendance: 6,153; Umpires: Chen Tsung-Hsin (TPE)
27 September; 18:30	WP: Jo Byeong-hyeon; Sv: Park Yeong-hyun	Boxscore	LP: Kazuki Kondo	Toyohashi Municipal Baseball Stadium, Toyohashi; Attendance: 6,153; Umpires: Chen Tsung-Hsin (TPE)

== Basketball ==
Summary

Team	Event	Group Stage				Quarterfinals	Semifinals	Final / BM	
Team	Event	Opposition Score	Opposition Score	Opposition Score	Rank	Opposition Score	Opposition Score	Opposition Score	Rank
South Korea men's	Men's 5x5 tournament	Saudi Arabia; W 82–66	Indonesia; W 102–48	Japan; W 100–83	1 Q	Jordan; W 114–80	Iran; W 77–51	Japan; W 67–57	1st place, gold medalist(s)
South Korea women's	Women's 5x5 tournament	Malaysia; W 106–40	Mongolia; W 88–61	Chinese Taipei; W 73–59	1 Q	Indonesia; W 101–59	China; W 85–80	Japan; W 75–70	1st place, gold medalist(s)
South Korea men's	Men's 3x3 tournament	Thailand; W 21–11	Japan; W 21–12	Singapore; W 19–14	1 Q	China; W 22–13	Philippines; W 21–9	Qatar; W 19–10	1st place, gold medalist(s)
South Korea women's	Women's 3x3 tournament	Thailand; W 13–12	Indonesia; W 21–4	Singapore; W 22–13	1 Q	Chinese Taipei; W 14–12	Japan; L 8–19	Thailand; W 21–8	3rd place, bronze medalist(s)

=== 5x5 basketball ===
==== Men's tournament ====
Team roster

- Lee Hyun-jung
- Choi Jun-yong
- Byeon Jun-hyeong
- Lee Jung-hyun
- Yu Ki-sang
- Lee Woo-suk
- Moon Jeong-hyeon
- Yeo Jun-seok
- Moon Yu-hyeon
- Jang Jae-seok
- Lee Seoung-hyun
- Daniel Edi

Preliminary Rounds – Group A

Pos	Team	Pld	W	L	PF	PA	PD	Pts	Qualification
1	South Korea	3	3	0	284	197	+87	6	Quarterfinals
2	Japan (H)	3	2	1	267	233	+34	5	Quarterfinals
3	Saudi Arabia	3	1	2	246	257	−11	4	Quarterfinals
4	Indonesia	3	0	3	190	300	−110	3	

Source: AsianGames2026.org
(H) Hosts

10 September 2026
16:00

Report
Box score

South Korea	82–66	Saudi Arabia
Scoring by quarter: 24–17, 17–11, 33–19, 8–19
Pts: Lee H. 23; Rebs: Lee J. 7 Asts: Byeon, Lee J. 4		Pts: Al-Muwallad 18; Rebs: Al-Marwani, Al-Suwailem 9 Asts: Al-Marwani 5

Aichi International Arena, Nagoya
Referees: Wissam Zein (SYR), Chuang Chih-chun (TPE), Hu Jing (CHN)

11 September 2026
16:00

Report
Box score

Indonesia	48–102	South Korea
Scoring by quarter: 10–18, 20–21, 11–31, 7–32
Pts: Saputera 17; Rebs: Xzavierro 11; Asts: Beane 3		Pts: Lee H. 24; Rebs: Lee H. 10; Asts: Moon Y. 8

Aichi International Arena, Nagoya
Attendance: 5,154
Referees: Chuang Chih-chun (TPE), Rakesh Ramalingaiah (IND), Mandy Ngieng (MAS)

13 September 2026
19:00

Report
Box score

Japan	83–100	South Korea
Scoring by quarter: 17–19, 25–21, 24–31, 17–29
Pts: Kurokawa 21; Rebs: Kirk 12; Asts: Harper 6		Pts: Lee J. 25; Rebs: Jang 8 Asts: Lee H., Lee J. 7

Aichi International Arena, Nagoya
Attendance: 8,182
Referees: Nattapong Jontapa (THA), Mohammad Taha (JOR), Mandy Ngieng (MAS)

Quarterfinals

16 September 2026
10:00

Report
Box score

Jordan	80–114	South Korea
Scoring by quarter: 8–28, 19–23, 24–34, 29–29
Pts: Tucker 22; Rebs: Hussein 4 Asts: Ibrahim 6		Pts: Lee H. 28; Rebs: Lee H., Lee W. 9 Asts: Lee J. 6

Aichi International Arena, Nagoya
Attendance: 7,904
Referees: Yuen Chun Yip (HKG), Chuang Chih-chun (TPE), Abdullah Al-Hejaili (KSA)

Semifinals

18 September 2026
16:00

Report
Box score

South Korea	77–51	Iran
Scoring by quarter: 12–8, 24–16, 25–13, 16–14
Pts: Lee H. 26; Rebs: Lee H. 14; Asts: Lee H. 4		Pts: Jamshidi 12; Rebs: Kazemi 11; Asts: Heydari, Kazemi 3

Aichi International Arena, Nagoya
Attendance: 5,758
Referees: Wissam Zein (SYR), Chuang Chih-chun (TPE), Glenn Cornelio (PHI)

Final

20 September 2026
19:40

Report
Box score

Japan	57–67	South Korea
Scoring by quarter: 16–12, 12–16, 19–27, 10–12
Pts: Kanechika 13; Rebs: Kirk 8 Asts: Kirk, Kurokawa 3		Pts: Lee H. 27; Rebs: Lee H. 18; Asts: Lee J. 7

Aichi International Arena, Nagoya
Attendance: 7,360
Referees: Rabah Noujaim (LBN), Yuen Chun Yip (HKG), Nattapong Jontapa (THA)

==== Women's tournament ====
Team roster

- Heo Ye-eun
- Kang Lee-seul
- An He-ji
- Choi I-saem
- Jeong Hyun
- Lee So-hee
- Kang Yoo-lim
- Park So-hee
- Lee Hae-ran
- Hong Yu-sun
- Jin An

Preliminary Rounds – Group C

Pos	Team	Pld	W	L	PF	PA	PD	Pts	Qualification
1	South Korea	3	3	0	267	160	+107	6	Quarterfinals
2	Chinese Taipei	3	2	1	233	199	+34	5	Quarterfinals
3	Mongolia	3	1	2	217	245	−28	4	Quarterfinals
4	Malaysia	3	0	3	180	293	−113	3	

Source: aichi-nagoya2026.org

18 September 2026
10:00

Report

South Korea	106–40	Malaysia
Scoring by quarter: 22–10, 37–12, 22–10, 25–8
Pts: Lee S. 21; Rebs: Hong 12; Asts: An 10		Pts: Chong 9 Rebs: Phey Chyi, Yap 4 Asts: Foo 6

Aichi International Arena, Nagoya
Attendance: 7,791
Referees: Mohammad Taha (JOR), Hu Jing (CHN), Abdullah Al-Hejaili (KSA)

21 September 2026
13:00

Report

Mongolia	61–88	South Korea
Scoring by quarter: 9–28, 10–23, 19–16, 23–21
Pts: Robinson 22; Rebs: Robinson 4 Asts: Bayarmaa, Onolbaatar 4		Pts: Lee H. 20; Rebs: Hong Y. 4 Asts: Heo Y. 8

Aichi International Arena, Nagoya
Attendance: 3,863
Referees: Hu Jing (CHN), Glenn Cornelio (PHI), Abdullah Al-Hejaili (KSA)

22 September 2026
16:00

Report

South Korea	73–59	Chinese Taipei
Scoring by quarter: 20–17, 22–12, 17–12, 14–18
Pts: Choi 17; Rebs: Lee S.-h. 9 Asts: Heo 6		Pts: Lin Y. T. 12; Rebs: Hsiao 6 Asts: Lin Y. T. 6

Aichi International Arena, Nagoya
Attendance: 5,883
Referees: Yana Nikogossyan (KAZ), Wissam Zein (SYR), Shigeyuki Arisawa (JPN)

Quarterfinals

24 September 2026
10:00

Report

South Korea	101–59	Indonesia
Scoring by quarter: 28–18, 24–12, 19–13, 30–16
Pts: Choi 16; Rebs: three players 5 Asts: Heo 8		Pts: Retong 14; Rebs: three players 4 Asts: Madafa 5

Aichi International Arena, Nagoya
Attendance: 3,922
Referees: Chuang Chih-Chun (TPE), Yuen Chun Yip (HKG), Ami Takano (JPN)

Semifinals

25 September 2026
16:00

Report

China	80–85	South Korea
Scoring by quarter: 19–17, 22–19, 24–25, 15–24
Pts: Zhang Z. 22; Rebs: Chen 10; Asts: Wang 10		Pts: Lee S. 23; Rebs: Lee H., Lee S. 6 Asts: Heo 9

Aichi International Arena, Nagoya
Attendance: 3,593
Referees: Mohammad Taha (JOR), Glenn Cornelio (PHI), Yana Nikogossyan (KAZ)

Final

26 September 2026
19:20

Report

Japan	70–75	South Korea
Scoring by quarter: 15–27, 8–15, 28–21, 19–12
Pts: Owaki 23; Rebs: Owaki 13; Asts: Higuchi, Owaki 5		Pts: Lee H. 24; Rebs: Lee H. 9 Asts: An 7

Aichi International Arena, Nagoya
Attendance: 7,089
Referees: Wissam Zein (SYR), Mahsa Kargari (IRI), Mandy Ngieng (MAS)

=== 3x3 basketball ===
==== Men's tournament ====
Preliminary Rounds – Group D

Pos	Team	Pld	W	L	PF	PA	PD	Pts	Qualification
1	South Korea	3	3	0	61	37	+24	6	Quarterfinals
2	Japan	3	2	1	54	57	−3	5	Play-ins
3	Singapore	3	1	2	52	50	+2	4	Play-ins
4	Thailand	3	0	3	40	63	−23	3	

Source: asiangames2026.org

22 September
18:55

Report

South Korea	21–11	Thailand
Pts: Kim 8		Pts: Panpet 4

Kinjō-futō Station Square, Nagoya
Referees: Liu Chee (MAS), Nie Cong (CHN)

22 September
20:35

Report

Japan	12–21	South Korea
Pts: Roy 7		Pts: Lee J. 9

Kinjō-futō Station Square, Nagoya
Referees: Nie Cong (CHN), Danusorn Laosaksam (THA)

23 September
20:10

Report

Singapore	14–19	South Korea
Pts: Ching 8		Pts: Lee D. 7

Kinjō-futō Station Square, Nagoya
Referees: Liu Chee (MAS), Danusorn Laosaksam (THA)

Quarterfinals

24 September
18:55

Report

South Korea	22–13	China
Pts: Ku, Lee J.Y. 6		Pts: Liu 7

Kinjō-futō Station Square, Nagoya
Referees: Rina Nozaki (JPN), Alexandr Rulyov (KAZ)

Semfinals

25 September
13:50

Report

Philippines	9–21	South Korea
Pts: Pablo, Buenaflor 3		Pts: Kim 8

Kinjō-futō Station Square, Nagoya
Referees: Su Yu-yen (TPE), Neoh Yuen (MAS)

Final

25 September
19:30

Report

South Korea	19–10	Qatar
Pts: Lee Ju-yeong 9		Pts: Mousa 4

Kinjō-futō Station Square, Nagoya
Referees: Su Yu-yen (TPE), Neoh Yuen (MAS)

==== Women's tournament ====
Preliminary Rounds – Group D

Pos	Team	Pld	W	L	PF	PA	PD	Pts	Qualification
1	South Korea	3	3	0	56	29	+27	6	Quarterfinals
2	Thailand	3	2	1	43	25	+18	5	Play-ins
3	Singapore	3	1	2	42	49	−7	4	Play-ins
4	Indonesia	3	0	3	21	59	−38	3	

Source: 2026 Asian Games

21 September
12:25

Report

Thailand	12–13	South Korea
Pts: Naumkong 5		Pts: Heo 6

Kinjō-futō Station Square, Nagoya
Referees: Su Yu-yen (TPE), Rina Nozaki (JPN)

21 September
14:05

Report

Indonesia	4–21	South Korea
Pts: Fadillah 2		Pts: Heo 10

Kinjō-futō Station Square, Nagoya
Referees: Nie Cong (CHN), Rina Nozaki (JPN)

23 September
12:00

Report

Singapore	13–22	South Korea
Pts: Lim 7		Pts: Kim 9

Kinjō-futō Station Square, Nagoya
Referees: Nie Cong (CHN), Chen Kuan-i (TPE)

Quarterfinals

24 September
17:40

Report

South Korea	14–12	Chinese Taipei
Pts: Song 6		Pts: Chen, Tsai 4

Kinjō-futō Station Square, Nagoya
Referees: Rina Nozaki (JPN), Liu Chee (MAS)

Semifinals

25 September
13:00

Report

South Korea	8–19	Japan
Pts: Kim J-e 5		Pts: Hirashita, Hiruichi 7

Kinjō-futō Station Square, Nagoya
Referees: Chen Kuan-i (TPE), Liu Chee (MAS)

Bronze medal match

25 September
18:00

Report

South Korea	21–8	Thailand
Pts: Choi Y-s 10		Pts: Panted, Palida 3

Kinjō-futō Station Square, Nagoya
Referees: Nie Cong (CHN), Rina Nozaki (JPN)

== Diving ==
Men

Athlete	Event	Preliminary		Final	
Athlete	Event	Points	Rank	Points	Rank
Kim Yeong-nam	1 m springboard	—N/a		373.30	2nd place, silver medalist(s)
Kim Ji-wook	1 m springboard	—N/a		336.20	5
Kim Yeong-taek	3 m springboard	381.15	3 Q	373.30	4
Shin Jung-hwi	3 m springboard	373.85	4 Q	357.25	7
Kim Yeong-taek	10 m platform	374.35	4 Q	302.75	9
Shin Jung-hwi	10 m platform	374.35	7 Q	357.95	7
Kim Ji-wook; Shin Jung-whi	3 m synchronized springboard	—N/a		342.75	4
Shin Jung-whi; Kim Yeong-taek	10 m synchronized platform	—N/a		375.90	3rd place, bronze medalist(s)

Women

Athlete	Event	Preliminary		Final	
Athlete	Event	Points	Rank	Points	Rank
Kim Su-ji	1 m springboard	—N/a		245.05	3rd place, bronze medalist(s)
Kim Na-hyun	1 m springboard	—N/a		228.40	5
Kim Su-ji	3 m springboard	253.45	4 Q	282.45	4
Lee Ye-joo	3 m springboard	223.00	6 Q	225.00	6
Moon Na-yun	10 m platform	270.00	5 Q	259.90	8
Kim Na-hyun	10 m platform	247.35	7 Q	262.80	7
Kim Su-ji; Kim Na-hyun	3 m synchronized springboard	—N/a		254.70	2nd place, silver medalist(s)
Kim Na-hyun; Moon Na-yun	10 m synchronized platform	—N/a		276.90	3rd place, bronze medalist(s)

== Esports ==
Team

Athlete	Event	Group Stage					Quarterfinal	Semifinal	Final / BM	
Athlete	Event	Opposition Score	Opposition Score	Opposition Score	Opposition Score	Rank	Opposition Score	Opposition Score	Opposition Score	Rank
Song Young-woo; Kim Dok-yum	eFootball	Qatar; W N/A	Iran; L 0–1	Saudi Arabia; L 0–2	—N/a	3	Did not advance			
Han Ji-hoon; Han Seong-geon; Jo Seong-bin; Jung Yun-ho; Lee Hun-min; Lee Seop-gyu	Honor of Kings	Myanmar; W 2–0	—N/a	—N/a	—N/a	1 Q	Philippines; L 0–2	Did not advance		
Kang Dong-shin	Puyo Puyo Champions	Kurihara (JPN); L 1–3	Gonzalvo (PHI); W 3–2	Yu WL (HKG); W 3–0	Pivovarov (KAZ); W 3–0	2 Q	Paritosh (IND); W 5–0	Kuo T-A (TPE); W 10–3	Kurihara (JPN); L 2–10	2nd place, silver medalist(s)
Euh Hong; Hong Hyeon-gi; Kim Jae-yeon; Kim Jun-seo; Kim Sang-min; Ko Tae-hyun; Park So-yeon	Identity V	Malaysia; L 0–2	Vietnam; W 1–1	Hong Kong; W 2–1	—N/a	2 Q	China; L 0–2	Did not advance		
Choi Woo-je; Kim Geon-woo; Kim Geon-bu; Lee Min-hyung; Lee Sang-hyeok; Ryu Min-seok	League of Legends	Chinese Taipei; W 1–0	India; W 1–0	Hong Kong; W 1–0	—N/a	1 Q	—N/a	Saudi Arabia; W 2–0	Chinese Taipei; W 3–0	1st place, gold medalist(s)
Park Sung-soon; Cho Min-hyeok; Jin Su-been; Kim Jae-young; Lee Jih-wan	Pokémon Unite	India; W 2–0	Japan; L 1–2	—N/a	—N/a	2 Q	Singapore; W 2–1	Japan; L 0–2	Did not advance	3rd place, bronze medalist(s)
Lee Kwang-noh; Yeon Jeag-il; Bae Jae-min	Competitive Martial Arts (Note: Covers three titles: Street Fighter 6, Tekken 8, The King of Fighters XV – This is a team competition with only one medal to be awarded.)	Kazakhstan; W 3–0	Hong Kong; W 3–0	—N/a	—N/a	1 Q	Chinese Taipei; W 3–0	Saudi Arabia; W 3–1	Japan; W 5–2	1st place, gold medalist(s)

Athlete	Event	Qualification		Semifinal		Final						Rank
Athlete	Event	Result	Rank	Result	Rank	Race 1	Rank	Race 2	Rank	Race 3	Rank	Rank
Kim Young-chan	Gran Turismo 7	2:11.682	1 Q	20:34.777	1 Q	3	2	10	1	12	3	3rd place, bronze medalist(s)

Athlete	Event	Match 1	Match 2	Match 3	Match 4	Match 5	Match 6	Match 7	Match 8	Match 9	Match 10	Match 11	Match 12	WWCD	Total	Rank
Athlete	Event	Result	Result	Result	Result	Result	Result	Result	Result	Result	Result	Result	Result	WWCD	Total	Rank
Jeon Hyeon-bin; Jeoung Yu-chan; Kim Jun-ha; Park Sang-cheol; Song Su-an	PUBG Mobile	9	2	4	3	7	13	16	0	1	7	5	4	1	71	6

== Field hockey ==
Summary

Key:

- s.o. – Match decided by penalty-shootout.

Team	Event	Group Stage						Semi-final	Final / BM	
Team	Event	Opposition Result	Opposition Result	Opposition Result	Opposition Result	Opposition Result	Rank	Opposition Result	Opposition Result	Rank
Men's team	Men's tournament	Bangladesh; W 5–0	Indonesia; W 5–0	India; L 2–8	Sri Lanka; W 5–0	Japan; W 3–2	2 Q	Malaysia; L 1–2	Pakistan; L 3–5	4
Women's team	Women's tournament	Chinese Taipei; W 3–1	Kazakhstan; W 7–0	Bangladesh; W 8–0	China; L 0–3	Malaysia; W 2–1	2 Q	India; L 0–2	Japan; D 0–0 (2–4 s.o.)	4

Men's tournament

Team squads

The following is the South Korea roster in the men's field hockey tournament of the 2026 Asian Games.

Head coach: (South Korea) Min Taeseok

1. Kim Jae-hyeon (GK)
4. Kim Kyu-beom
6. Yang Ji-hun (C)
7. Sim Jae-won
8. Rim Jin-kang
9. Kim Jae-ho
10. Kim Yong-bok
11. Park Cheol-eon
12. Lee Gang-san
15. Lim Do-hyun
17. Oh Se-yong
19. Son Da-in
23. Kim Hyeong-jin
24. Bae Soung-min
27. Jin Geon-hyo
28. Kim Hyeon-hong
30. Lee Seung-woo
32. Kim Jae-han (GK)
49. Choi Chan-kyu
51. Lee Hye-seung

Preliminary round – Pool A

Pos	Team	Pld	W	D	L	GF	GA	GD	Pts	Qualification
1	India	5	5	0	0	49	4	+45	15	Semi-finals
2	South Korea	5	4	0	1	20	10	+10	12	Semi-finals
3	Japan (H)	5	3	0	2	29	7	+22	9	Fifth place classification
4	Bangladesh	5	2	0	3	9	23	−14	6	Fifth place classification
5	Sri Lanka	5	1	0	4	6	38	−32	3	Ninth place game
6	Indonesia	5	0	0	5	6	37	−31	0	Eleventh place game

Source: FIH
Rules for classification: 1) points; 2) matches won; 3) goal difference; 4) goals for; 5) head-to-head result; 6) field goals for.
(H) Hosts

18 September 2026
11:00

South Korea	5–0	Bangladesh
Bae 21'; Oh 21'; Lee G. 30'; Yang 32'; Sim 58'	Report

Gifu Prefectural Green Stadium
Umpires:
Lim Hong-Zhen (SGP)
James Unkles (AUS)

22 September 2026
11:00

Indonesia	0–5	South Korea
	Report	Lim Do. 11', 23', 40', 42'; Kim. H 33'

Gifu Prefectural Green Stadium
Umpires:
Haroon Rashid (PAK)
Hideki Kinoshita (JPN)

24 September 2026
15:00

South Korea	2–8	India
Kim J. 42'; Kim Y. 52'	Report	Lakra 4'; Sukhjeet 10'; Harmanpreet 11'; Abhishek 15', 38'; Dilpreet 26', 32'; Rajinder 60'

Gifu Prefectural Green Stadium
Umpires:
Coen van Bunge (NED)
Rawi Anbananthan (MAS)

26 September 2026
15:00

Sri Lanka	0–5	South Korea
		Park 29'; Son 50'; Lim Do. 54', 58'; Yang 55'

Gifu Prefectural Green Stadium
Umpires:
Mazin Al-Shukaili (OMA)
Deepak Joshi (IND)

28 September 2026
17:45

South Korea	3–2	Japan
Yang 29', 42'; Rim 52'	Report	Yamasaki 4'; Fujishima 60'

Gifu Prefectural Green Stadium
Umpires:
Rawi Anbananthan (MAS)
Haroon Rashid (PAK)

Semi-final

1 October 2026
19:00

Malaysia	2–1	South Korea
Azrai 40', 45'	Report	Lee G. 42'

Gifu Prefectural Green Stadium
Umpires:
Sean Rapaport (RSA)
Lim Hong-Zhen (SGP)

Bronze medal match

3 October 2026
16:30

Pakistan	5–3	South Korea
Khan 4'; Abdul 30'; Rana 52', 54'; Shahid 59'	Report	Lee G. 12'; Kim Y. 18'; Yang 25'

Gifu Prefectural Green Stadium
Umpires:
Coen van Bunge (NED)
Rawi Anbananthan (MAS)

Women's tournament

Team squads

The following is the South Korea roster in the women's field hockey tournament of the 2026 Asian Games.

Head coach: (South Korea) Kim Yong-soo

1. Kim Eun-ji (GK)
2. Kim Yu-jin
4. Hong Sol-beot-nara
5. Kim Jung-ju
6. An Su-jin
7. Lee Yu-ri (C)
8. Kim Seon-a
9. Park Seung-ae
10. Lee Yu-jin
11. Jung Sung-hee
12. Lee Ju-yeon
13. Jin Su-yeon
14. Park Seo-yeon
16. Kim Jeong-ihn
17. Seo Da-hae
18. Park Yeong-eun
19. Choi Ji-yun
23. Park Mi-hyang
26. Son Hye-ryoung
31. Lee Seo-yeon (GK)

Preliminary round – Pool A

Pos	Team	Pld	W	D	L	GF	GA	GD	Pts	Qualification
1	China	5	5	0	0	46	0	+46	15	Semi-finals
2	South Korea	5	4	0	1	20	5	+15	12	Semi-finals
3	Malaysia	5	3	0	2	14	7	+7	9	Fifth place classification
4	Chinese Taipei	5	2	0	3	8	21	−13	6	Fifth place classification
5	Bangladesh	5	0	1	4	6	30	−24	1	Ninth place game
6	Kazakhstan	5	0	1	4	4	35	−31	1	Eleventh place game

Source: FIH
Rules for classification: 1) points; 2) matches won; 3) goal difference; 4) goals for; 5) head-to-head result; 6) field goals for.

18 September 2026
13:00

South Korea	3–1	Chinese Taipei
Park Seu. 13', 33'; An 42'	Report	Wang W. 41'

Gifu Prefectural Green Stadium
Umpires:
Binish Hayat (PAK)
Aleisha Neumann (AUS)

21 September 2026
09:00

South Korea	7–0	Kazakhstan
Park Mi. 1'; An 28'; Kim J. 29'; L. Yu-ri 31'; Choi 39'; Park Seu. 39'; Jung 40'	Report

Gifu Prefectural Green Stadium
Umpires:
Rinky See (HKG)
Valerie Koh (SGP)

23 September 2026
09:00

Bangladesh	0–8	South Korea
	Report	Choi 5', 19'; Park Seu. 12', 15', 23', 60'; Park Mi. 28'; Kim Seo. 34'

Gifu Prefectural Green Stadium
Umpires:
Emi Yamada (JPN)
Zhou Fuyi (CHN)

25 September 2026
13:00

South Korea	0–3	China
	Report	Zhang 40'; Liu 46'; Chen Ya. 60'

Gifu Prefectural Green Stadium
Umpires:
Cookie Tan (SGP)
Laurine Delforge (BEL)

27 September 2026
15:00

Malaysia	1–2	South Korea
Syafi 60'	Report	Park Seu. 15+'; An 29'

Gifu Prefectural Green Stadium
Umpires:
Aleisha Neumann (AUS)
Liu Xiaoying (CHN)

Semi-final

30 September 2026
19:00

India	2–0	South Korea
Ishika 44'; Tete 48'	Report

Gifu Prefectural Green Stadium
Umpires:
Aleisha Neumann (AUS)
Liu Xiaoying (CHN)

Bronze medal match

2 October 2026
16:30

Japan	0–0	South Korea
	Report; SO Report
Penalties
Shimada (penalty shoot-out scored); Murayama (penalty shoot-out scored); Hasegawa (penalty shoot-out scored); Kobayakawa (penalty shoot-out scored)	4–2	(penalty shoot-out missed) Jung; (penalty shoot-out missed) Park Seu. (penalty shoot-out scored) An; (penalty shoot-out scored) L. Yu-jin

Gifu Prefectural Green Stadium
Umpires:
Liu Xiaoying (CHN)
Valerie Koh (SGP)

== Football ==
Summary

Key:

- A.E.T – After extra time.
- P – Match decided by penalty-shootout.

Team	Event	Group Stage				Quarterfinals	Semifinals	Final / BM	
Team	Event	Opposition Score	Opposition Score	Opposition Score	Rank	Opposition Score	Opposition Score	Opposition Score	Rank
South Korea men's under-23	Men's tournament	Qatar; W 4–1	Saudi Arabia; W 2–0	—N/a	1 Q	Vietnam; W 4–0	China; W 2–1	Japan; W 1–0	1st place, gold medalist(s)
South Korea women's	Women's tournament	Myanmar; W 5–0	Bangladesh; W 6–0	North Korea; D 1–1	2 Q	Uzbekistan; W 6–3	Japan; L 0–2	China; W 1–0	3rd place, bronze medalist(s)

=== Men's tournament ===
Team squads

South Korea announced their final squad on 9 July.

Head coach: Lee Min-sung

No.	Pos.	Player	Date of birth (age)	Club
1	GK	Kim Jun-hong	3 June 2003 (age 23)	(Korea Football Association) Suwon Samsung Bluewings
2	DF	Kang Min-jun	8 April 2003 (age 23)	(Korea Football Association) Pohang Steelers
3	DF	Choi Woo-jin	18 July 2004 (age 22)	(Korea Football Association) Jeonbuk Hyundai Motors
4	DF	Park Seong-hoon	27 January 2003 (age 23)	(Korea Football Association) FC Seoul
5	DF	Kim Ji-soo	24 December 2004 (age 21)	(The Football Association) Brentford
6	MF	Lee Gi-hyuk*	7 July 2000 (age 26)	(Korea Football Association) Gangwon FC
7	MF	Eom Ji-sung*	9 May 2002 (age 24)	(Football Association of Wales) Swansea City
8	MF	Lee Seung-won	6 March 2003 (age 23)	(Korea Football Association) Gangwon FC
9	FW	Lee Young-jun	23 May 2003 (age 23)	(Swiss Football Association) Grasshopper
10	MF	Bae Jun-ho	21 August 2003 (age 23)	(The Football Association) Stoke City
11	MF	Yang Hyun-jun*	25 May 2002 (age 24)	(Scottish Football Association) Celtic
12	GK	Kim Min-seung	9 February 2005 (age 21)	(Korea Football Association) Paju Frontier
13	MF	Kang Sang-yoon	31 May 2004 (age 22)	(Korea Football Association) Jeonbuk Hyundai Motors
14	MF	Lee Hyun-ju	7 February 2003 (age 23)	(Portuguese Football Federation) Arouca
15	MF	Hwang Do-yun	9 April 2003 (age 23)	(Korea Football Association) FC Seoul
16	DF	Choi Seok-hyun	13 January 2003 (age 23)	(Korea Football Association) Ulsan HD
17	MF	Yang Min-hyeok	16 April 2006 (age 20)	(Royal Belgian Football Association) Westerlo
18	FW	Kim Myung-jun	21 March 2006 (age 20)	(Royal Belgian Football Association) Jong Genk
19	MF	Park Seung-soo	17 March 2007 (age 19)	(The Football Association) Newcastle United U21
20	DF	Park Gyeong-seop	2 July 2004 (age 22)	(Korea Football Association) Incheon United
21	GK	Lee Seung-hwan	5 April 2003 (age 23)	(Korea Football Association) Chungbuk Cheongju
22	DF	Bae Hyun-seo	16 February 2005 (age 21)	(Korea Football Association) Gyeongnam FC
23	DF	Shin Min-ha	15 September 2005 (age 21)	(Korea Football Association) Gangwon FC

* Over-aged player.

Preliminary Rounds – Group D

Pos	Team	Pld	W	D	L	GF	GA	GD	Pts	Qualification
1	South Korea	2	2	0	0	6	1	+5	6	Advance to knockout stage
2	Saudi Arabia	2	1	0	1	2	2	0	3	Advance to knockout stage
3	Qatar	2	0	0	2	1	6	−5	0	

Source: Aichi–Nagoya 26
15 September 2026
19:30

Qatar	1–4	South Korea
Sherif 85'	Report	Eom Ji-sung 7', 20', 45+1'; Kim Myung-jun 66'

Paloma Mizuho Rugby Stadium, Nagoya
Attendance: 1,633
Referee: Adam Kersey (Australia)

22 September 2026
19:00

South Korea	2–0	Saudi Arabia
Shin Min-ha 67'; Kim Myung-jun 69'	Report

Paloma Mizuho Rugby Stadium, Nagoya
Attendance: 1,042
Referee: Hiroki Kasahara (Japan)

Quarter-finals

25 September 2026
19:30

South Korea	4–0	Vietnam
Lee Young-jun 15', 81'; Kim Ji-soo 77'; Kim Myung-jun 88'	Report

Paloma Mizuho Rugby Stadium, Nagoya
Attendance: 2,167
Referee: Firdavs Nosafarov (Uzbekistan)

Semi-finals

30 September 2026
15:00

South Korea	2–1	China
Lee Young-jun 33'; Bae Jun-ho 82'	Report	Wang Yudong 22'

Nagai Stadium, Osaka
Attendance: 4,470
Referee: Sadullo Gulmurodi (Tajikistan)

Gold medal match

3 October 2026
19:30

(gold) South Korea	1–0	Japan (silver)
Eom Ji-sung 61'	Report

Toyota Stadium, Toyota
Attendance: 30,086
Referee: Adam Kersey (Australia)

=== Women's tournament ===
Team squads

The following players list is the South Korea squad for the 2026 Asian Games.

Head Coach: Shin Sang-woo .

No.	Pos.	Player	Date of birth (age)	Caps	Goals	Club
1	GK	Kim Kyeong-hee (김경희)	17 March 2003 (age 23)	3	0	(Korea Football Association) Suwon FC
12	GK	Ryu Ji-soo (류지수)	3 September 1997 (age 29)	5	0	(Korea Football Association) Sejong Sportstoto
21	GK	Kim Min-jung (김민정)	12 September 1996 (age 30)	24	0	(Korea Football Association) Incheon Hyundai Steel Red Angels
2	DF	Han Da-in (한다인)	9 February 2002 (age 24)	2	0	(Korea Football Association) Suwon FC
3	DF	Lee Min-hwa (이민화)	29 October 1999 (age 26)	8	0	(Korea Football Association) Hwacheon KSPO
4	DF	Noh Jin-young (노진영)	3 June 2000 (age 26)	13	0	(Korea Football Association) Gyeongju KHNP
5	DF	Ko Yoo-jin (고유진) (captain)	24 January 1997 (age 29)	13	3	(Korea Football Association) Incheon Hyundai Steel Red Angels
15	DF	Jeong Yu-jin (정유진)	25 December 2000 (age 25)	2	1	(Korea Football Association) Incheon Hyundai Steel Red Angels
16	DF	Jang Sel-gi (장슬기)	31 May 1994 (age 32)	115	18	(Korea Football Association) Gyeongju KHNP
20	DF	Kim Hye-ri (김혜리)	25 June 1990 (age 36)	142	3	(Korea Football Association) Suwon FC
22	DF	Choo Hyo-joo (추효주)	29 July 2000 (age 26)	65	6	(Canadian Soccer Association) Ottawa Rapid
6	MF	Park Hye-jeong (박혜정)	30 March 2000 (age 26)	8	0	(Korea Football Association) Incheon Hyundai Steel Red Angels
8	MF	Park Ye-na (박예나)	14 May 1999 (age 27)	2	0	(Korea Football Association) Mungyeong Sangmu
10	MF	Ji So-yun (지소연)	21 February 1991 (age 35)	176	75	(Korea Football Association) Suwon FC
11	MF	Choe Yu-ri (최유리)	16 September 1994 (age 32)	73	14	(Korea Football Association) Suwon FC
13	MF	Hyun Seul-gi (현슬기)	28 January 2001 (age 25)	6	0	(Korea Football Association) Gyeongju KHNP
14	MF	Jung Min-young (정민영)	28 September 2000 (age 26)	12	1	(Canadian Soccer Association) Ottawa Rapid
17	MF	Yun Su-jeong (윤수정)	20 June 2002 (age 24)	2	2	(Korea Football Association) Suwon FC
18	MF	Kim Min-ji (김민지)	21 August 2003 (age 23)	10	1	(Korea Football Association) Seoul WFC
19	MF	Kang Tae-kyung (강태경)	10 December 1998 (age 27)	0	0	(Korea Football Association) Seoul WFC
23	MF	Kang Chae-rim (강채림)	23 March 1998 (age 28)	51	10	(Korea Football Association) Gangjin Swans
7	FW	Son Hwa-yeon (손화연)	15 March 1997 (age 29)	65	15	(Korea Football Association) Gangjin Swans
9	FW	Jeong Da-bin (정다빈)	5 September 2005 (age 21)	7	2	(Norwegian Football Federation) Stabæk

Preliminary Rounds – Group F

Pos	Team	Pld	W	D	L	GF	GA	GD	Pts	Qualification
1	North Korea	3	2	1	0	19	1	+18	7	Advance to knockout stage
2	South Korea	3	2	1	0	12	1	+11	7	Advance to knockout stage
3	Myanmar	3	0	1	2	0	13	−13	1	
4	Bangladesh	3	0	1	2	0	16	−16	1	

Source: Aichi–Nagoya 26
14 September 2026
19:30

South Korea	5–0	Myanmar
Kim Min-ji 29', 33', 59'; Jang Sel-gi 38'; Choe Yu-ri 76'	Report

Nagai Stadium, Osaka
Attendance: 500
Referee: Tian Jin (China)

17 September 2026
16:00

Bangladesh	0–6	South Korea
	Report	Kim Min-ji 16'; Jeong Da-bin 42'; Choe Yu-ri 65'; Ji So-yun 77'; Hyun Seul-gi 79'; Ko Yoo-jin 90+1'

Nagai Stadium, Osaka
Attendance: 135
Referee: Fatemeh Nasiri Looshani (Iran)

21 September 2026
16:00

South Korea	1–1	North Korea
Yoon Su-jeong 46'	Report	Chae Un-yong 35'

Shizuoka Stadium, Fukuroi
Attendance: 2,032
Referee: Supiree Testhomya (Thailand)

Quarter-finals

25 September 2026
19:30

South Korea	6–3	Uzbekistan
Yoon Su-jeong 6', 44'; Choe Yu-ri 17', 45+1'; Khabibullaeva 74' (o.g.); Kim Min-ji 90+4'	Report	Khabibullaeva 10'; Jang Sel-gi 64' (o.g.); Kudratova 66'

Nagai Stadium, Osaka
Attendance: 240
Referee: Mu Mingxin (China)

Semi-finals

29 September 2026
19:30

Japan	2–0	South Korea
Kamiya 54', 63'	Report

Shizuoka Stadium, Fukuroi
Attendance: 998
Referee: Lê Thị Ly (Vietnam)

Bronze medal match

2 October 2026
15:00

China	0–1	South Korea (bronze)
	Report	Noh Jin-young 4'

Shizuoka Stadium, Fukuroi
Attendance: 1,331
Referee: Rawdha Al-Mansoori (United Arab Emirates)

== Golf ==
Athlete	Event	Round 1	Round 2	Round 3	Round 4	Total		
Athlete	Event	Score	Score	Score	Score	Score	Par	Rank
Kim Joo-hyung	Men's individual	67	66	65	64	262	–18	1st place, gold medalist(s)
Mun Do-yeob	Men's individual	66	67	69	70	272	–8	T8
Kim Seong-hyeon	Men's individual	68	71	69	73	281	+1	T24
Kim Joo-hyung; Mun Do-yeob; Kim Seong-hyeon	Men's team	133	133	134	134	534	–26	2nd place, silver medalist(s)
Yang Yun-seo	Women's individual	68	65	72	68	273	–7	4
Park Seo-jin	Women's individual	71	73	74	65	283	3	T15
Kim Gyu-been	Women's individual	68	73	78	70	289	+9	21
Yang Yun-seo; Park Seo-jin; Kim Gyu-been	Women's team	136	138	146	133	553	–7	T4

== Handball ==
Summary

Team	Event	Group stage							Quarterfinal	Semifinal	Final / BM	
Team	Event	Opposition Score	Opposition Score	Opposition Score	Opposition Score	Opposition Score	Opposition Score	Rank	Opposition Score	Opposition Score	Opposition Score	Rank
South Korea men's	Men's tournament	Kuwait; W 26–23	Iran; D 26–26	Bahrain; L 21–30	Kazakhstan; W 44–22	—N/a		2 Q	China; W 32–26	Qatar; L 30–32	Japan; L 32–37	4
South Korea women's	Women's tournament	Hong Kong; W 48–16	Kazakhstan; W 42–18	Uzbekistan; W 43–13	China; W 37–17	Vietnam; W 46–18	Japan; W 27–23	—N/a				1st place, gold medalist(s)

=== Men's tournament ===
Team rosters

- Kim Tae-gwan (11)
- Song Jea-woo (17)
- Park Kwang-soon (23)
- Kim Jin-young (26)
- Lee Yo-seb (30)
- Ha Min (33)
- Kim Tae-ung (63)
- Won Min-jun (65)
- Kim Dong-uk (66)
- Kim Jin-ho (71)
- Jeon Jin-soo (74)
- Kim Rak-chan (77)
- Park Se-ung (79)
- Kim Yeon-bin (97)
- Jin Yu-sung (98)
- Park Jae-yong (99)

Group play – Group B

Pos	Team	Pld	W	D	L	GF	GA	GD	Pts	Qualification
1	Bahrain	4	4	0	0	135	86	+49	8	Quarterfinals
2	South Korea	4	2	1	1	117	101	+16	5	Quarterfinals
3	Kuwait	4	2	0	2	117	97	+20	4	Quarterfinals
4	Iran	4	1	1	2	98	109	−11	3	Quarterfinals
5	Kazakhstan	4	0	0	4	84	158	−74	0	

Source: asiangames2026.org

21 September 2026; 17:00	South Korea	26–23	Kuwait	Toyoda Gosei Memorial Gymnasium; Referees: Furukawa, Murata (JPN)
21 September 2026; 17:00	Kim Jin-y. 6	(12–12)	H. Al-Adwani, Al-Mutawa 6	Toyoda Gosei Memorial Gymnasium; Referees: Furukawa, Murata (JPN)
21 September 2026; 17:00	1× (yellow card) 3× (suspension)	Report	1× (yellow card) 2× (suspension)	Toyoda Gosei Memorial Gymnasium; Referees: Furukawa, Murata (JPN)

22 September 2026; 17:30	Iran	26–26	South Korea	Toyoda Gosei Memorial Gymnasium; Referees: Al-Shahi, Al-Wahibi (OMA)
22 September 2026; 17:30	Asari, Heidarian 7	(14–13)	Kim Jin-y. 7	Toyoda Gosei Memorial Gymnasium; Referees: Al-Shahi, Al-Wahibi (OMA)
22 September 2026; 17:30	1× (yellow card) 5× (suspension)	Report	1× (suspension)	Toyoda Gosei Memorial Gymnasium; Referees: Al-Shahi, Al-Wahibi (OMA)

23 September 2026; 17:30	South Korea	21–30	Bahrain	Toyoda Gosei Memorial Gymnasium; Referees: Zhou, Cheng (CHN)
23 September 2026; 17:30	Park K. 5	(10–12)	Naser 6	Toyoda Gosei Memorial Gymnasium; Referees: Zhou, Cheng (CHN)
23 September 2026; 17:30	1× (yellow card) 2× (suspension)	Report	3× (suspension)	Toyoda Gosei Memorial Gymnasium; Referees: Zhou, Cheng (CHN)

25 September 2026; 17:30	Kazakhstan	22–44	South Korea	Kasugai City Gymnasium; Referees: Furukawa, Murata (JPN)
25 September 2026; 17:30	Oxikbayev, Tilekkabyl 5	(10–23)	Kim Y. 7	Kasugai City Gymnasium; Referees: Furukawa, Murata (JPN)
25 September 2026; 17:30	3× (suspension) 1× (red card)	Report	2× (suspension)	Kasugai City Gymnasium; Referees: Furukawa, Murata (JPN)

Quarterfinals

26 September 2026; 14:00	South Korea	32–26	China	Kasugai City Gymnasium; Referees: Ismoilov, Ismoilov (UZB)
26 September 2026; 14:00	Kim R., Park S. 6	(16–12)	Li 7	Kasugai City Gymnasium; Referees: Ismoilov, Ismoilov (UZB)
26 September 2026; 14:00	3× (suspension)	Report	1× (suspension)	Kasugai City Gymnasium; Referees: Ismoilov, Ismoilov (UZB)

Semifinals

28 September 2026; 17:30	South Korea	30–32	Qatar	Toyoda Gosei Memorial Gymnasium; Referees: Gheisarian, Gheisarian (IRI)
28 September 2026; 17:30	Kim Jin-y. 7	(16–16)	Madadi 8	Toyoda Gosei Memorial Gymnasium; Referees: Gheisarian, Gheisarian (IRI)
28 September 2026; 17:30	1× (yellow card) 1× (suspension)	Report	1× (yellow card) 5× (suspension) 1× (red card)	Toyoda Gosei Memorial Gymnasium; Referees: Gheisarian, Gheisarian (IRI)

Bronze medal match

29 September 2026; 17:00	Japan	37–32	South Korea	Toyoda Gosei Memorial Gymnasium; Referees: Al-Wahibi, Al-Shahi (OMA)
29 September 2026; 17:00	Nakata 9	(17–12)	Kim Jin-y. 7	Toyoda Gosei Memorial Gymnasium; Referees: Al-Wahibi, Al-Shahi (OMA)
29 September 2026; 17:00	1× (yellow card) 4× (suspension)	Report	1× (yellow card) 1× (suspension)	Toyoda Gosei Memorial Gymnasium; Referees: Al-Wahibi, Al-Shahi (OMA)

=== Women's tournament ===
Team rosters

- Lee Hye-won (4)
- Lee Won-jung (7)
- Lee Yeong-yeong (9)
- Ryu Eun-hee (11)
- Jeong Jin-hui (12)
- Park Sae-young (16)
- Han Mi-seul (18)
- Kang Eun-hye (19)
- Jo Eun-been (20)
- Kim So-ra (21)
- Woo Bit-na (23)
- Gwon Han-na (24)
- Cha Seo-yeon (26)
- Jeon Ji-yeon (27)
- Gim Bo-eun (31)
- Kim Min-seo (37)

All-play-all tournament

Pos	Team	Pld	W	D	L	GF	GA	GD	Pts
1st place, gold medalist(s)	South Korea	6	6	0	0	243	105	+138	12
2nd place, silver medalist(s)	Japan (H)	6	5	0	1	217	120	+97	10
3rd place, bronze medalist(s)	China	6	4	0	2	189	154	+35	8
4	Kazakhstan	6	3	0	3	164	187	−23	6
5	Uzbekistan	6	2	0	4	116	206	−90	4
6	Hong Kong	6	1	0	5	131	209	−78	2
7	Vietnam	6	0	0	6	128	207	−79	0

Source: asiangames2026.org
(H) Hosts

19 September 2026; 10:00	South Korea	48–16	Hong Kong	Toyoda Gosei Memorial Gymnasium; Referees: Mazaheri, Mozafari (IRI)
19 September 2026; 10:00	Lee W. 9	(25–9)	Chong 6	Toyoda Gosei Memorial Gymnasium; Referees: Mazaheri, Mozafari (IRI)
19 September 2026; 10:00		Report	1× (suspension)	Toyoda Gosei Memorial Gymnasium; Referees: Mazaheri, Mozafari (IRI)

20 September 2026; 13:30	South Korea	42–18	Kazakhstan	Kasugai City Gymnasium; Referees: Al-Enezi, Al-Naseem (KUW)
20 September 2026; 13:30	Woo 10	(18–8)	Khassakhanova 7	Kasugai City Gymnasium; Referees: Al-Enezi, Al-Naseem (KUW)
20 September 2026; 13:30	1× (suspension)	Report	2× (suspension) 2× (red card)	Kasugai City Gymnasium; Referees: Al-Enezi, Al-Naseem (KUW)

23 September 2026; 15:30	Uzbekistan	13–43	South Korea	Kasugai City Gymnasium; Referees: Abo, Al-Rashed (JOR)
23 September 2026; 15:30	Saparbaeva 5	(8–22)	Joo 7	Kasugai City Gymnasium; Referees: Abo, Al-Rashed (JOR)
23 September 2026; 15:30	3× (suspension)	Report	3× (suspension)	Kasugai City Gymnasium; Referees: Abo, Al-Rashed (JOR)

25 September 2026; 17:30	South Korea	37–17	China	Toyoda Gosei Memorial Gymnasium; Referees: Al-Enezi, Al-Naseem (KUW)
25 September 2026; 17:30	Kwon, Lee Y. 5	(19–8)	Liu X. 5	Toyoda Gosei Memorial Gymnasium; Referees: Al-Enezi, Al-Naseem (KUW)
25 September 2026; 17:30	3× (suspension)	Report	5× (suspension)	Toyoda Gosei Memorial Gymnasium; Referees: Al-Enezi, Al-Naseem (KUW)

26 September 2026; 17:30	South Korea	46–18	Vietnam	Toyoda Gosei Memorial Gymnasium; Referees: Abo, Al-Rashed (JOR)
26 September 2026; 17:30	Jo 8	(22–9)	Nguyễn T.A. 10	Toyoda Gosei Memorial Gymnasium; Referees: Abo, Al-Rashed (JOR)
26 September 2026; 17:30	1× (suspension)	Report	5× (suspension) 1× (red card)	Toyoda Gosei Memorial Gymnasium; Referees: Abo, Al-Rashed (JOR)

27 September 2026; 18:00	Japan	23–27	South Korea	Toyoda Gosei Memorial Gymnasium; Referees: Al-Enezi, Al-Naseem (KUW)
27 September 2026; 18:00	Gray 6	(12–16)	Kwon 7	Toyoda Gosei Memorial Gymnasium; Referees: Al-Enezi, Al-Naseem (KUW)
27 September 2026; 18:00	1× (suspension)	Report	1× (yellow card) 5× (suspension) 1× (red card)	Toyoda Gosei Memorial Gymnasium; Referees: Al-Enezi, Al-Naseem (KUW)

== Kabaddi ==
Team	Event	Group stage					Semi-final	Final	
Team	Event	Opposition Score	Opposition Score	Opposition Score	Opposition Score	Rank	Opposition Score	Opposition Score	Rank
Men's team	Men's	Bangladesh; L 35–39	India; L 31–63	Chinese Taipei; L 37–43	Japan; L 35–62	5	Did not advance		

== Karate ==
Men

Athlete	Event	Round of 32	Round of 16	Quarterfinals	Semifinals	Repechage	Final / BM	
Athlete	Event	Opposition Result	Opposition Result	Opposition Result	Opposition Result	Opposition Result	Opposition Result	Rank
Hwang Tae-yeon	Individual kata	—N/a	Hung (HKG); L 1–4	Did not advance				
Park Geon-ho	–60 kg	Lachica (PHI); L 1–2	Did not advance					
An Gwang-min	–75 kg	—N/a	Bye	Bani Al-Marjeh (SYR); L 2–11	Did not advance			

Women

Athlete	Event	Round of 16	Quarterfinals	Semifinals	Repechage	Final / BM	
Athlete	Event	Opposition Result	Opposition Result	Opposition Result	Opposition Result	Opposition Result	Rank
Choi Ha-eun	Individual kata	Thing (NEP); W 5–0	Ono (JPN); L 0–5	Did not advance	Bùi (VIE); L 0–5	Did not advance	
Yang Ye-won	–50 kg	Bye	Adriano (PHI); L 0–4	Did not advance			
An Jeong-eun	–61 kg	Bye	Jong S-r (PRK); W 3–0	Gong Li (CHN); L 0–8	—N/a	Shimada (JPN); L 2–9	5

== Modern pentathlon ==
Korea entered eight pentathletes to compete at the Games.

Individual

Athlete	Event	Fencing ranking round (épée one touch)		Semi-finals													Final												
Athlete	Event	Fencing ranking round (épée one touch)		Fencing		Obstacles			Swimming (100 m freestyle)			Laser-run (10 m laser pistol / 3000 m cross-country)			Total points	Final rank	Fencing		Obstacles			Swimming			Laser-run			Total points	Final rank
Athlete	Event	V–D	Rank	Rank	MP points	Time	Rank	MP points	Time	Rank	MP points	Time	Rank	MP points	Total points	Final rank	Rank	MP points	Time	Rank	MP points	Time	Rank	MP points	Time	Rank	MP points	Total points	Final rank
Jun Woong-tae	Men's	26–9	4	1	250	0:34.47	12	342	0:56.25	5	319	11:22.36	3	618	1529	3 Q	9	218	00:26.41	11	366	00:55.23	4	324	10:13.97	2	687	1595	2nd place, silver medalist(s)
Kim Young-ha	Men's	21–14	11	9	218	0:25.63	7	369	0:53.61	1	332	11:50.05	6	590	1509	6 Q	7	226	00:25.66	10	368	00:53.35	1	334	11:29.35	15	611	1539	12
Lee Jong-hyeon	Men's	22–13	9	2	244	0:23.45	5	375	0:57.52	6	313	11:39.50	7	601	1533	2 Q	11	214	00:22.62	5	378	00:56.55	9	318	10:17.26	3	683	1593	3rd place, bronze medalist(s)
Seo Chang-wan	Men's	31–4	1	3	238	0:23.91	6	374	0:57.36	5	314	11:19.96	3	621	1547	1 Q	3	238	00:22.67	6	377	00:55.44	6	323	10:47.95	7	653	1591	5
Jang Ha-eun	Women's	18–14	14	7	226	0:50.91	13	293	1:04.28	6	279	12:37.27	3	543	1341	7 Q	13	210	1:02.15	18	259	1:05.19	13	275	11:51.35	3	589	1333	16
Kim Un-ju	Women's	23–9	4	2	244	0:34.32	5	343	1:09.90	11	251	13:17.36	8	503	1341	8 Q	2	244	0:35.25	11	340	1:08.34	18	259	12:24.34	8	556	1399	7
Seong Seung-min	Women's	24–8	2	1	250	0:30.84	3	353	1:05.30	7	274	13:31.40	10	489	1365	2 Q	1	250	0:29.26	4	358	1:01.14	7	295	11:51.20	2	589	1492	1st place, gold medalist(s)
Shin Su-min	Women's	19–13	11	6	228	0:41.45	8	321	1:02.88	3	286	12:58.41	5	522	1357	6 Q	11	214	0:31.70	9	350	1:02.80	10	286	12:50.97	11	530	1380	12

Team

Athlete	Event	Fencing	Obstacle	Swimming	Laser Run	Total	Rank
Jun Woong-tae; Lee Jong-hyeon; Seo Chang-wan	Men	670	1121	965	2023	4779	1st place, gold medalist(s)
Seong Seung-min; Kim Un-ju; Shin Su-min	Women	708	1048	840	1685	4271	2nd place, silver medalist(s)

== Rugby sevens ==
Summary

Team	Event	Pool round				Quarterfinal	Semifinal	Final / BM	
Team	Event	Opposition Score	Opposition Score	Opposition Score	Rank	Opposition Score	Opposition Score	Opposition Score	Rank
South Korea men's	Men's tournament	Thailand; W 24–7	Japan; L 14–24	Kazakhstan; W 33–5	2 Q	United Arab Emirates; W 29–12	Hong Kong; L 14–35	Bronze medal match Japan; L 5–17	4

=== Men's tournament ===
Group play

Pos	Team	Pld	W	D	L	PF	PA	PD	Pts	Qualification
1	Japan	3	3	0	0	100	14	+86	9	Quarter-finals
2	South Korea	3	2	0	1	71	36	+35	7	Quarter-finals
3	Kazakhstan	3	1	0	2	17	76	−59	5	
4	Thailand	3	0	0	3	12	74	−62	3	

First match(es) will be played: 1 October 2026. Source:

1 October 2026
9:50

Thailand	7–24	South Korea
Try: Wechokittikorn 12' c Con: Chitpavanasakul (1/1)	Report	Try: Jang J. (2) 4' m, 10' c Oh 7' c Lee M. 14' m Con: Jang H. (2/4)

Paloma Mizuho Rugby Stadium
Referee: Morgan White (Hong Kong)

1 October 2026
16:30

Japan	24–14	South Korea
Try: Takamoto 1' c Shirakuni 6' c Ogita 10' m Kerevi 13' m Con: Shiwachi (2/3); Yamaguchi (0/1)	Report	Try: Kim S. 3' c Oh 11' c Con: Jang H. (2/2)

Paloma Mizuho Rugby Stadium
Referee: Leow Wei Liang (Singapore)

2 October 2026
9:50

South Korea	33–5	Kazakhstan
Try: Park W. (2) 2' c, 11' m Jang J. (2) 7+' c, 9' c Kim N. 13' c Con: Jang H. (3/3); Kim N. (1/2)	Report	Try: Tur 14+' m Con: Tur (0/1)

Paloma Mizuho Rugby Stadium
Referee: Craig Chan (Hong Kong)

Quarterfinals

2 October 2026
14:50

South Korea	29–12	United Arab Emirates
Try: Jang J. (3) 4' c, 7+' m, 14+' m Chang 7' c Kim C. 12' m Con: Jang H. (1/1); Kim N. (1/3); Jang J. (0/1)	Report	Try: Janes 6' m Dubois 11' c Con: Sproul (0/1); Affley (1/1)

Paloma Mizuho Rugby Stadium
Referee: Morgan White (Hong Kong)

Semifinals

3 October 2026
12:20

Hong Kong	35–14	South Korea
Try: Christie 2' c Sayers 7' c Phillips 8' c Denmark 12' c Avitabile 14' c Con: Phillips (4/4); Avitabile (1/1)	Report	Try: Jang J. 10' c Lee M. 13' c Con: Kim S. (1/1); Lee M. (1/1)

Paloma Mizuho Rugby Stadium
Referee: Ibuki Tetsuka (Japan)

Bronze medal game

3 October 2026
18:10

South Korea	5–17	Japan
Try: Lee M. 14+' m Con: Lee M. (0/1)	Report	Try: Tokito 2' m Nakano 6' m Shiwachi 11' c Con: Shiwachi (1/3)

Paloma Mizuho Rugby Stadium
Referee: Morgan White (Hong Kong)

== Sepak takraw ==
Athlete	Event	Group Stage				Semifinals	Final	
Athlete	Event	Opposition Score	Opposition Score	Opposition Score	Rank	Opposition Score	Opposition Score	Rank
Shin Hee-seop; Kim Hyeong-jong; Cheon Dong-ryung; Lee Min-ju; Kim Jung-man; Seonwoo Young-su; Park Hyeong-eun; Oh Dae-yang; Lee Woo-jin; Jeong Ha-sung; Jeong Won-deok; Lim Tae-gyun	Men's team regu	Thailand; L 0–3	Laos; W 2–1	Indonesia; L 0–3	3	Did not advance		
Jeong Ha-sung; Jeong Won-deok; Kim Hyeong-jong; Lee Woo-jin; Lim Tae-gyun; Youngsu Seon-woo	Men's quadrant	Indonesia; L 0-2	Singapore; W 2-0	Japan; L 0-2	3	Did not advance		
Han Ye-ji; Kim Se-young; Lee Min-ju	Women's doubles	India; W 2–0	Japan; W 2-0	Philippines; W 2-1	1 Q	Vietnam; L 0-2	Did not advance	3rd place, bronze medalist(s)
Bae Chae-eun; Bae Han-oul; Choi Ji-na; Han Ye-ji; Jang Ga-yeon; Jeon Gyu-mi; Kim Ji-young; Kim Se-young; Kim Ye-ji; Lee Min-ju; Park Seon-ju; Wi Ji-seon	Women's team regu	Indonesia; W 3–0	Japan; W 3–0	Thailand; L 0–3	2 Q	Indonesia; W 2–0	Thailand; L 0–2	2nd place, silver medalist(s)

== Shooting ==
=== Men ===
Individual

Athlete	Event	Qualification		Final	
Athlete	Event	Points	Rank	Points	Rank
Hong Su-hyeon	10 m air pistol	581-16x	8 Q	222.1	3rd place, bronze medalist(s)
Kim Tae-young	10 m air pistol	563-15x	44	Did not advance	
So Seung-seob	10 m air pistol	572-20x	22	Did not advance	
Lee Gun-hyeok	25 m rapid fire pistol	588-20x	2 Q	32 GR	1st place, gold medalist(s)
Song Jong-ho	25 m rapid fire pistol	580-26x	4	Did not advance	
Yoon Seo-yeong	25 m rapid fire pistol	581-18x	3 Q	12	6
Gwon Hyeop-jun	10 m air rifle	623.6	28	Did not advance	
Gwon Hyeop-jun	50 m rifle 3 position	579-22x	19	Did not advance	
Park Ha-jun	10 m air rifle	631.4	4 Q	145.7	7
Shin Min-ki	10 m air rifle	629.2	9 Q	166.2	6
Joung Seong-woo	50 m rifle 3 position	592-38x	2 Q	304.2	7
Park Sung-hyun	50 m rifle 3 position	580-27x	17	Did not advance	
Ahn Dae-myeong	Trap	114	18	Did not advance	
Jang Ja-yong	Skeet	113	21	Did not advance	
Kim Min-su	Skeet	110	33	Did not advance	
Lee Jong-jun	Skeet	118	9	Did not advance	

Team

Athlete	Event	Final	
Athlete	Event	Points	Rank
Hong Su-hyeon; Kim Tae-young; So Seung-seob	10 m air pistol	1716-51x	8
Lee Gun-hyeok; Song Jong-ho; Yoon Seo-yeong	25 m rapid fire pistol	1749-64x	1st place, gold medalist(s)
Gwon Hyeop-jun; Park Ha-jun; Shin Min-ki	10 m air rifle	1884.2	3rd place, bronze medalist(s)
Gwon Hyeop-jun; Joung Seong-woo; Park Sung-hyun	50 m rifle 3 position	1751-87x	3rd place, bronze medalist(s)
Jang Ja-yong; Kim Min-su; Lee Jong-jun	Skeet	341	6

=== Women ===
Individual

Athlete	Event	Qualification		Final	
Athlete	Event	Points	Rank	Points	Rank
Choo Ga-eun	10 m air pistol	582-19x GR	1 Q	246.3 AR	1st place, gold medalist(s)
Kim Bo-mi	10 m air pistol	574-22x	10	Did not advance	
Oh Ye-jin	10 m air pistol	574-14x	12	Did not advance	
Oh Ye-jin	25 m pistol	579-24x	10	Did not advance	
Bong Seo-rin	25 m pistol	581-14x	7 Q	7	8
Yang Ji-in	25 m pistol	575-27x	17	Did not advance	
Ban Hyo-jin	10 m air rifle	634.9	2 Q	230.4	3rd place, bronze medalist(s)
Cho Eun-byeol	10 m air rifle	627.6	19	Did not advance	
Kwon Yu-na	10 m air rifle	633.3	8 Q	Did not advance	
Kim Bo-kyung	50 m rifle 3 position	581-30x	25	Did not advance	
Kim Ji-eun	50 m rifle 3 position	588-28x	7 Q	348.4	3rd place, bronze medalist(s)
Oh Se-hee	50 m rifle 3 position	580-25x	29	Did not advance	
Lee Bo-na	Trap	109	12	Did not advance	
An Il-ji	Skeet	105	18	Did not advance	
Jang Kook-hee	Skeet	112	7 Q	19	5
Kim Chae-eun	Skeet	107	15	Did not advance	

Team

Athlete	Event	Final	
Athlete	Event	Points	Rank
Choo Ga-eun; Kim Bo-mi; Oh Ye-jin	10 m air pistol	1730-55x	2nd place, silver medalist(s)
Bong Seo-rin; Oh Ye-jin; Yang Ji-in	25 m pistol	1735-65x	2nd place, silver medalist(s)
Ban Hyo-jin; Cho Eun-byeol; Kwon Yu-na	10 m air rifle	1895.8	4
Kim Bo-kyung; Kim Ji-eun; Oh Se-hee	50 m rifle 3 position	1749-83x	6
An Il-ji; Jang Kook-hee; Kim Chae-eun	Skeet	324	4

=== Mixed ===
Team

Athlete	Event	Qualification		Final	
Athlete	Event	Points	Rank	Points	Rank
Choo Ga-eun; Hong Su-hyeon	10 m air pistol	582-23x	3 Q	478.0	2nd place, silver medalist(s)
Ban Hyo-jin; Park Ha-jun	10 m air rifle	633.2	3 Q	502.9	2nd place, silver medalist(s)
Ahn Dae-myeong; Lee Bo-na	Trap	133	7	Did not advance	
Jang Kook-hee; Lee Jong-jun	Skeet	143	2 Q	51	2nd place, silver medalist(s)

== Skateboarding ==
Athlete	Event	Qualification		Final	
Athlete	Event	Score	Rank	Score	Rank
Lee Ro-un	Men's park	76.42	5 Q	65.55	6
Kim Dong-hyeok	Men's park	74.14	7 Q	72.21	5
Juni Kang	Men's street	157.17	3 Q	180.85	1st place, gold medalist(s)
Lee Jun-seung	Men's street	113.06	6 Q	124.95	5
Cho Hyun-ju	Women's park	67.23	7 Q	54.83	7
Gwak Min-ji	Women's park	62.19	8 Q	41.00	8
Shin Ji-yul	Women's street	129.88	4 Q	153.29	4
Park Ji-bin	Women's street	119.91	6 Q	58.47	8

== Soft tennis ==
Men

Athlete	Event	Group stage				Second Stage	Quarter-finals	Semi-finals	Final / BM	
Athlete	Event	Opposition Score	Opposition Score	Opposition Score	Rank	Opposition Score	Opposition Score	Opposition Score	Opposition Score	Rank
Kim Jin-woong	Singles	Keavirak (CAM); W 4–0	Bataa (MGL); W 4–0	Kurosaka (JPN); L 3–4	2	Did not advance				
Lee Ha-neul	Singles	Khatri (NEP); W 4–0	Arcilla (PHI); W 4–1	—N/a	1 Q	—N/a	Chen P-y (TPE); L 2–4	Did not advance		
Kim Hyun-soo; Kim Jin-woong; Lee Ha-neul; Lee Hyung-won; Park Jae-kyu	Team	Nepal; W 3–0	Indonesia; W 2–1	—N/a	1 Q	—N/a	Philippines; W 2–0	Chinese Taipei; L 1–2	Did not advance	3rd place, bronze medalist(s)

Women

Athlete	Event	Group stage				Quarter-finals	Semi-finals	Final / BM	
Athlete	Event	Opposition Score	Opposition Score	Opposition Score	Rank	Opposition Score	Opposition Score	Opposition Score	Rank
Hwang Jeong-mi	Singles	Hacnolath (LAO); W 4–0	Klomkamol (THA); W 4–0	—N/a	1 Q	Ri J-m (PRK); L 2–4	Did not advance		
Lee Su-jin	Singles	Meth (CAM); W 4–0	Huang S-y (TPE); W 4–2	—N/a	1 Q	Temma (JPN); L 2–4	Did not advance		
Eom Ye-jin; Hwang Jeong-mi; Kim Han-sul; Kim Yeon-hwa; Lee Su-jin	Team	Pakistan; W 3–0	Cambodia; W 3–0	Japan; L 0–3	1 Q	—N/a	Chinese Taipei; L 1–2	Did not advance	3rd place, bronze medalist(s)

Mixed

Athlete	Event	Group stage				Second Stage	Quarter-finals	Semi-finals	Final / BM	
Athlete	Event	Opposition Score	Opposition Score	Opposition Score	Rank	Opposition Score	Opposition Score	Opposition Score	Opposition Score	Rank
Kim Hyun-soo; Lee Su-jin	Doubles	Arain / Shallwani (PAK); W 5–0	Manalac / Nuguit (PHI); W 5–2	—N/a	1 Q	—N/a	Maeda / Maruyama (JPN); L 1–5	Did not advance		
Kim Yeon-hwa; Park Jae-kyu	Doubles	Nyamdorj / Ganbaatar (MGL); W 5–0	Chao / Khun (CAM); W 5–0	Tiwari / Meena (IND); W 5–1	1 Q	Manalac / Nuguit (PHI); W 5–0	Lin W-c / Chiang M-y (TPE); W 5–4	Uematsu / Temma (JPN); L 1–5	Did not advance	3rd place, bronze medalist(s)

== Softball ==
Summary

Team	Event	Preliminary round								Final / BM	
Team	Event	Opposition Score	Opposition Score	Opposition Score	Opposition Score	Opposition Score	Opposition Score	Opposition Score	Rank	Opposition Score	Rank
South Korea women's	Women's tournament	Thailand; W 7–0	China; L 4–8	Philippines; L 3–7	Hong Kong; W 7–1	Japan; L 0–8	Singapore; W 9–1	Chinese Taipei; L 1–11	5	Did not advance	5

== Sport climbing ==
Boulder & lead

Athlete	Event	Semifinal		Final	
Athlete	Event	Result	Rank	Result	Rank
Lee Do-hyun	Men's boulder	99.7	1 Q	49.7	2nd place, silver medalist(s)
Chon Jong-won	Men's boulder	74.7	6 Q	30.0	5
Seo Chae-hyun	Women's boulder	100.0	1 Q	70.0	3rd place, bronze medalist(s)
Noh Hee-ju	Women's boulder	69.8	7 Q	69.7	5
Lee Do-hyun	Men's lead	33+	4 Q	38	3rd place, bronze medalist(s)
Noh Hyun-seung	Men's lead	31	5 Q	26+	7
Seo Chae-hyun	Women's lead	TOP	1 Q	TOP	1st place, gold medalist(s)
Kim Chae-yeong	Women's lead	52	3 Q	38+	4

Speed

Athlete	Event	Qualification		Quarterfinal		Semifinal		Final	
Athlete	Event	Time	Rank	Time	Rank	Time	Rank	Time	Rank
Jo Jin-yong	Men's speed 4	5.04	9 Q	5.93	3	Did not advance			
Kim Dong-jun	Men's speed 4	5.38	14 Q	4.85	4	Did not advance			
Jeong Ji-min	Women's speed 4	6.25	2 Q	6.39	1 Q	6.38	2 Q	6.18	3rd place, bronze medalist(s)
Sung Hana-reum	Women's speed 4	6.84	6 Q	FS	4 Q	Did not advance			

== Squash ==
Individual

Athlete	Event	Round of 64	Round of 32	Round of 16	Quarterfinal	Semifinal	Final	
Athlete	Event	Opposition Result	Opposition Result	Opposition Result	Opposition Result	Opposition Result	Opposition Result	Rank
Ryu Jeong-min	Men's singles	Bye	Almaghrebi (KUW); W 3–0	Ng EY (MAS); L 0–3	Did not advance			
Na Joo-young	Men's singles	Bye	Al-malki (QAT); W 3–0	Leung (HKG); L 1–3	Did not advance			
Ryoo Bo-ram	Women's singles	—N/a	Mamadjanova (UZB); W 3–0	Chan SY (HKG); L 0–3	Did not advance			
Kim Da-mi	Women's singles	—N/a	Khanna (IND); L 0–3	Did not advance				
Eum Hwa-yeong; Lee Min-woo	Mixed doubles	—N/a	Bye	Aribado / Pelino (PHI); L 0–2	Did not advance			
Shi Yuxi; Cheng Linglu	Mixed doubles	—N/a	Bye	Reyes / Dalida (PHI); W 2–0	Arnold / Chandaran (MAS); L 0–2	Did not advance		

Team

Athlete	Event	Group stage				Play-ins			Quarterfinal	Semifinal	Final	
Athlete	Event	Opposition Score	Opposition Score	Opposition Score	Rank	Opposition Score	Opposition Score	Rank	Opposition Score	Opposition Score	Opposition Score	Rank
Ryu Jeong-min; Oh Seo-jin; Na Joo-young; Lee Min-woo	Men's	India; L 0–3	China; W 3–0	—N/a	2 Q	—N/a			Pakistan; L 0–2	Did not advance		
Heo Min-gyeong; Eum Hwa-yeong; Ryoo Bo-ram; Kim Da-mi	Women's	Mongolia; W 3–0	Hong Kong; L 0–3	Pakistan; W 3–0	2 Q	—N/a			Japan; L 0–2	Did not advance		

== Surfing ==
Athlete	Event	Round 1		Round 2	Round 3	Quarter-finals	Semi-finals	Final / BM	
Athlete	Event	Score	Rank	Opposition Result	Opposition Result	Opposition Result	Opposition Result	Opposition Result	Rank
Jun Seo-hyun	Men's shortboard	5.76	3 R2	Pereira (SRI); W 11.50–7.34	Meydi (INA); L 6.80–10.16	Did not advance			
Kanoa Palmiano	Men's shortboard	9.83	1 R3	Bye	Sae-Iew (THA); W 9.80–8.74	Alciso (PHI); L 7.24–10.76	Did not advance		
Im Su-jung	Women's shortboard	5.00	2 R2	Akter (BAN); W 8.73–3.84	Yang (CHN); L 8.63–11.00	Did not advance			
Lee Na-la	Women's shortboard	7.10	2 R2	Naseem (MDV); W 8.20–1.20	Higgs (THA); L 7.97–12.10	Did not advance			

Qualification legend: R3 - Qualifies to elimination rounds; R2 - Qualifies to repechage round

== Swimming ==
Men

Athlete	Event	Heat		Final	
Athlete	Event	Time	Rank	Time	Rank
Kim Young-beom	50 m freestyle	21.71 GR	1 Q	21.66 GR	1st place, gold medalist(s)
Ji Yu-chan	50 m freestyle	22.23	3 Q	21.94	3rd place, bronze medalist(s)
Hwang Sun-woo	100 m freestyle	48.13	2 Q	47.65	2nd place, silver medalist(s)
Kim Young-beom	100 m freestyle	48.34	3 Q	47.79	3rd place, bronze medalist(s)
Hwang Sun-woo	200 m freestyle	1:47.97	2 Q	1:44.62	2nd place, silver medalist(s)
Kim Woo-min	200 m freestyle	DNS		Did not advance	
Lee Ho-joon	400 m freestyle	3:54.12	9 Q	3:51.18	9
Kim Jun-woo	800 m freestyle	—N/a		7:43.86	2nd place, silver medalist(s)
Kim Woo-min	800 m freestyle	—N/a		DNS	
Kim Jun-woo	1500 m freestyle	—N/a		14:57.13	5
Kim Woo-min	1500 m freestyle	—N/a		15:16.52	8
Yoon Ji-hwan	50 m backstroke	24.74	2 Q	24.54	3rd place, bronze medalist(s)
Lee Ju-ho	50 m backstroke	25.61	12	Did not advance	
Yoon Ji-hwan	100 m backstroke	54.97	8 Q	55.29	9
Lee Ju-ho	100 m backstroke	54.43	3 Q	53.94	3rd place, bronze medalist(s)
Lee Ju-ho	200 m backstroke	1:58.90	2 Q	1:56.58	2nd place, silver medalist(s)
Choi Dong-yeol	50 m breaststroke	27.58	6 Q	27.12	4
Choi Dong-yeol	100 m breaststroke	59.46	2 Q	58.64	5
Cho Sung-jae	100 m breaststroke	1:00.79	10 Q	1:00.79	10
Cho Sung-jae	200 m breaststroke	2:11.39	4 Q	2:08.76	3rd place, bronze medalist(s)
Yang Jae-hoon	50 m butterfly	23.52	4 Q	23.60	9
Ji Yu-chan	50 m butterfly	23.93	14	Did not advance	
Yang Jae-hoon	100 m butterfly	52.19	5 Q	51.83	5
Kim Ji-hun	100 m butterfly	52.62	9 Q	52.41	9
Kim Min-seop	200 m butterfly	2:00.27	4 Q	1:55.94	3rd place, bronze medalist(s)
Park Jung-hun	200 m butterfly	2:00.72	5 Q	1:56.87	5
Kim Ji-hun	200 m individual medley	2:00.06	4 Q	1:59.78	6
Kim Min-suk	200 m individual medley	2:01.28	6 Q	1:59.69	4
Kim Min-seop	400 m individual medley	4:23.75	7 Q	4:20.31	8
Kim Min-suk	400 m individual medley	4:21.80	3 Q	4:17.96	6
Hwang Sun-woo; Kim Ji-hun; Yang Jae-hoon; Kim Young-beom; Kim Woo-min^{h} Ji Yu-chan^{h} Lee Ho-joon^{h} Kim Min-seop^{h}	4 × 100 m freestyle relay	3:19.55	4 Q	3:11.69	2nd place, silver medalist(s)
Kim Jun-woo; Kim Woo-min; Lee Ho-joon; Hwang Sun-woo; Kim Min-seop^{h} Yang Jae-hoon^{h}	4 × 200 m freestyle relay	7:14.35	3 Q	7:06.76	3rd place, bronze medalist(s)
Lee Ju-ho; Choi Dong-yeol; Yang Jae-hoon; Kim Young-beom; Yoon Ji-hwan^{h} Cho Sung-jae^{h} Kim Ji-hun^{h} Hwang Sun-woo^{h}	4 × 100 m medley relay	3:39.17	5 Q	3:31.97	3rd place, bronze medalist(s)

Women

Athlete	Event	Heat		Final	
Athlete	Event	Time	Rank	Time	Rank
Hur Yeon-kyung	50 m freestyle	25.68	10	Did not advance	
Hur Yeon-kyung	100 m freestyle	55.14	=5 Q	55.18	6
Jo Hyun-ju	100 m freestyle	56.43	11	Did not advance	
Jo Hyun-ju	200 m freestyle	2:02.45	7 Q	1:59.29	4
Han Da-kyung	400 m freestyle	4:14.54	6 Q	4:12.49	6
Kim Chae-yun	400 m freestyle	4:20.62	10 Q	4:15.69	8
Han Da-kyung	800 m freestyle	—N/a		DNS	
Kim Chae-yun	800 m freestyle	—N/a		8:42.28	6
Han Da-kyung	1500 m freestyle	—N/a		DNS	
Kim Chae-yun	1500 m freestyle	—N/a		16:31.87	4
Kim Seung-won	50 m backstroke	27.91	2 Q	27.72	3rd place, bronze medalist(s)
Lee Eun-ji	50 m backstroke	28.55	9 Q	28.53	7
Kim Seung-won	100 m backstroke	1:00.37	3 Q	1:00.10	3rd place, bronze medalist(s)
Lee Eun-ji	100 m backstroke	1:00.86	4 Q	1:00.51	5
Lee Eun-ji	200 m backstroke	2:11.61	3 Q	2:10.47	4
Park Si-eun	50 m breaststroke	31.62	=5 Q	31.45	5
Park Si-eun	100 m breaststroke	1:08.14	5 Q	1:07.63	5
Park Si-eun	200 m breaststroke	2:26.57	2 Q	2:22.69	2nd place, silver medalist(s)
An Se-hyeon	50 m butterfly	26.44	=6 Q	26.66	7
Lee Song-eun	50 m butterfly	27.13	=9 Q	27.10	8
An Se-hyeon	100 m butterfly	59.22	6 Q	58.09	4
Lee Song-eun	100 m butterfly	1:00.49	9 Q	DNS	
Kim Yun-hui	200 m butterfly	2:11.09	4 Q	2:09.81	4
Lee Hee Eun	200 m butterfly	2:12.64	7 Q	2:11.06	6
Lee Song-eun	200 m individual medley	2:15.66	6 Q	2:13.98	6
Lee Hee Eun	200 m individual medley	DNS		Did not advance	
Lee Hee Eun	400 m individual medley	4:55.30	9 Q	4:52.53	8
Lee Song-eun; Jo Hyun-ju; Hur Yeon-kyung; Kim Yun-hui; Han Da-kyung^{h} Lee Hee-eun^{h}	4 × 100 m freestyle relay	3:45.36	3 Q	3:40.26	4
Jo Hyun-ju; Hur Yeon-kyung; Han Da-kyung; Lee Song-eun; Kim Yun-hui^{h} Kim Chae-yun^{h}	4 × 200 m freestyle relay	8:16.64	3 Q	8:01.87	3rd place, bronze medalist(s)
Kim Seung-won; Park Si-eun; An Se-hyeon; Hur Yeon-kyung; Lee Eun-ji^{h} Lee Song-eun^{h} Jo Hyun-ju^{h}	4 × 100 m medley relay	4:05.83	3 Q	4:00.67	3rd place, bronze medalist(s)

Mixed

Athlete	Event	Heat		Final	
Athlete	Event	Time	Rank	Time	Rank
Kim Seung-won; Choi Dong-yeol; An Se Hyeon; Kim Young-beom; Lee Eun-ji^{h} Park Si-eun^{h} Kim Ji-hun^{h} Hwang Sun-woo^{h}	4 × 100 m medley relay	3:54.02	5 Q	3:44.12	3rd place, bronze medalist(s)

^{h} Swimmers who participated in the heats only.

== Table tennis ==
Men

Athlete	Event	Round of 32	Round of 16	Quarter-finals	Semi-finals	Final / BM	
Athlete	Event	Opposition Result	Opposition Result	Opposition Result	Opposition Result	Opposition Result	Rank
An Jae-hyun	Singles	Ri J-s (PRK); L 2–4	Did not advance				
Jang Woo-jin	Singles	Saleh (BHR); W 4–0	Fen Y-h (TPE); L 0–4	Did not advance			
Jang Woo-jin; Park Gyu-hyeon	Doubles	Ri J-s / U T-r (PRK); L 0–3	Did not advance				
Lim Jong-hoon; Oh Jun-sung	Doubles	Preechayan / Sanguansin (THA); W 3–0	Chew / Chua (SGP); W 3–0	Togami / Matsushima (JPN); L 1–3	Did not advance		

Women

Athlete	Event	Round of 32	Round of 16	Quarter-finals	Semi-finals	Final / BM	
Athlete	Event	Opposition Result	Opposition Result	Opposition Result	Opposition Result	Opposition Result	Rank
Joo Cheon-hui	Singles	Swarna (SRI); W 4–0	Zeng (SGP); W 4–2	Sun (CHN); L 2–4	Did not advance		
Shin Yu-bin	Singles	Rasmi (INA); W 4–0	Akasheva (KAZ); W 4–0	Wang (CHN); L 0–4	Did not advance		
Joo Cheon-hui; Shin Yu-bin	Doubles	Nafiz / Ibrahim (MDV); W 3–0	Tan / Lai (SGP); W 3–1	Paranang / Sawettabut (THA); L 1–3	Did not advance		
Kim Na-yeong; Lee Eun-hye	Doubles	Shaikh / Al-Malki (QAT); W 3–0	Doo HK / Ng WL (HKG); L 2–3	Did not advance			

Mixed

Athlete	Event	Round of 32	Round of 16	Quarter-finals	Semi-finals	Final / BM	
Athlete	Event	Opposition Result	Opposition Result	Opposition Result	Opposition Result	Opposition Result	Rank
Kim Na-yeong; Oh Jun-sung	Doubles	Pratama / Putri (INA); W 3–1	Matsushima / Harimoto (JPN); L 2–3	Did not advance			
Lim Jong-hoon; Shin Yu-bin	Doubles	Ahussein / Mohammed (QAT); W 3–0	Kharki / Mirkadirova (KAZ); W 3–0	Cheng I-c / Lin Y-j (TPE); W 3–2	Wang / Sun (CHN); L 2–4	Did not advance	3rd place, bronze medalist(s)

Team

Athlete	Event	Group stage			Round of 16	Quarter-finals	Semi-finals	Final	
Athlete	Event	Opposition Score	Opposition Score	Rank	Opposition Score	Opposition Score	Opposition Score	Opposition Score	Rank
An Jae-hyun; Jang Woo-jin; Lim Jong-hoon; Oh Jun-sung; Park Gyu-hyeon	Men's	Yemen; W 3–0	Mongolia; W 3–0	1 Q	India; W 3–0	Hong Kong; W 3–0	Japan; L 0–3	Did not advance	3rd place, bronze medalist(s)
Joo Cheon-hui; Kim Na-yeong; Lee Eun-hye; Park Ga-hyeon; Shin Yu-bin	Women's	Maldives; W 3–O	Kazakhstan; W 3–0	1 Q	Bye	Singapore; W 3–0	Japan; L 0–3	Did not advance	3rd place, bronze medalist(s)

== Teqball ==
Singles

Athlete	Event	Group stage						Quarterfinal	Semifinal	Repechage	Final / BM	
Athlete	Event	Opposition Score	Opposition Score	Opposition Score	Opposition Score	Opposition Score	Rank	Opposition Score	Opposition Score	Opposition Score	Opposition Score	Rank
Lee Jun-suk	Men	Alisa (LAO); W (12–1, 12–0)	Agustin (PHI); W (12–5, 12–6)	Putra (INA); W (12–1, 12–3)	Bá (VIE); W (12–8, 12–4)	Wase (JPN); W (12–5, 12–9)	1 Q	Aidarbekov (KGZ); W (12–2, 12–1)	Eidan (KUW); W (12–10, 3–2ret)	—N/a	Alelayawi (IRQ); W (12–11, 12–5)	1st place, gold medalist(s)

Doubles

Team	Event	Group stage						Quarterfinal	Semifinal	Repechage	Final / BM	
Team	Event	Opposition Score	Opposition Score	Opposition Score	Opposition Score	Opposition Score	Rank	Opposition Score	Opposition Score	Opposition Score	Opposition Score	Rank
Lee Jun-suk; Lee Tae-been	Men	Gonsalves / Beg (IND); W (12–4, 12–7)	Bá / Lê (VIE); L (7–12, 9–12)	—N/a			2 Q	Radhi / Alelayawi (IRQ); L (9–12, 7–12)	Did not advance	Bá / Lê (VIE); L (8–12, 12–11, 9–12)	Did not advance	
Kim Eun-jun; Jang Eun-seo	Mixed	Aidarbekov / Otorbaeva (KGZ); W (12–5, 12–9)	Inthalapheth / Phonexay (LAO); L (10–12, 12–6, 10–12)	Sakamoto / Wase (JPN); L (11–12, 12–10, 7–12)	Nguyễn / Trịnh (VIE); L (10–12, 12–11, 11–13)	Radhi / Abed (IRQ); W (8–12, 12–11, 12–9)	5	Did not advance				

== Triathlon ==
Individual

Athlete	Event	Time						Rank
Athlete	Event	Swim (0.75 km)	Trans 1	Bike (20 km)	Trans 2	Run (5 km)	Total	Rank
Kim Tae-gi	Men	9:20	0:38	28:36	0:17	17:25	56:16	15
Park Sang-min	Men	8:50	0:37	28:23	0:15	17:15	55:20	12
Jeong Hye-rim	Women	9:53	0:38	30:14	0:20	18:19	59:24	6
Kim Hye-rang	Women	10:01	0:41	32:11	0:20	18:37	1:01:50	11

Relay

Athlete	Event	Time						Rank
Athlete	Event	Swim (300 m)	Trans 1	Bike (6.6 km)	Trans 2	Run (1 km)	Total	Rank
Kim Hye-rang	Mixed	4:15	0:51	10:25	0:23	6:57	22:51	—N/a
Kim Tae-gi	Mixed	3:59	0:43	9:25	0:18	6:33	20:58	—N/a
Jeong Hye-rim	Mixed	4:22	0:45	10:37	0:22	6:55	23:01	—N/a
Park Sang-min	Mixed	4:01	0:41	10:09	0:21	6:25	21:37	—N/a
Total	Mixed	—N/a					1:28:27	4

== Volleyball ==
=== Beach ===
Athletes	Event	Preliminary round				Round of 16	Quarterfinal	Semifinal	Final / BM	
Athletes	Event	Opposition Score	Opposition Score	Opposition Score	Rank	Opposition Score	Opposition Score	Opposition Score	Opposition Score	Rank
Bae In-ho; Yeo Min-su	Men's	Lee CH / Lee LF (HKG); L 0–2 (17–21, 16–21)	Bogatu / Gurin (KAZ); L 0–2 (10–21, 10–21)	Faisal / Bayhaqly (INA); L 0–2 (16–21, 14–21)	3	Did not advance				
Bae Sang-bin; Oh Jeong-taek	Men's	Mou / Zainelabedin (QAT); L 0–2 (13–21, 9–21)	Taovato / Tipjan (THA); L 0–2 (9–21, 6–21)	Andibuduge / Randunu Pathirunnahalage (SRI); L 0–2 (11–21, 10–21)	3	Did not advance				
Kim Hyun-joo; Seo Ga-eun	Women's	Cao ST / Dong J (CHN); L 0–2 (7–21, 6–21)	Kudaikulova / Rasulbek Kyzy (KGZ); L 1–2 (17–21, 21–19, 15–5)	—N/a	3	Did not advance				
Kim Jeong-a; Shin Ji-eun	Women's	Kongphopsarutawadee / Naraphornrapat (THA); L 0–2 (8–21, 8–21)	Goh Y H / R Goh (MAS); W 2–1 (21–23, 21–15, 18–16)	—N/a	2 Q	Xia X / Yan X (CHN); L 0–2 (6–21, 12–21)	Did not advance			

=== Indoor ===
Summary

Team	Event	Group stage				Quarterfinals	Semifinals	Final / BM	
Team	Event	Opposition Score	Opposition Score	Opposition Score	Rank	Opposition Score	Opposition Score	Opposition Score	Rank
South Korea men's	Men's tournament	Philippines; W 3–0	Chinese Taipei; W 3–1	China; L 2–3	2 Q	Iran; L 2–3	India; L 1–3	Qatar; W 3–0	7
South Korea women's	Women's tournament	Hong Kong; W 3–0	Qatar; W 3–0	Vietnam; W 3–1	1 Q	Kazakhstan; W 3–0	Japan; L 0–3	Thailand; L 0–3	4

==== Men's tournament ====
Team roster

- Cha Young-seok
- Hwang Seung-bin
- Park Kyeong-min
- Heo Su-bong
- Han Tae-jun
- Lim Sung-jin
- Jeong Han-yong
- Im Dong-hyeok
- Choi Jun-hyeok
- Lee Sang-hyeon
- Shin Ho-jin
- Lim Jae-young

Group play – Pool D

Pos	Team	Pld	W	L	Pts	SW	SL	SR	SPW	SPL	SPR	Qualification
1	China	3	3	0	7	9	4	2.250	298	276	1.080	Quarterfinals
2	South Korea	3	2	1	7	8	4	2.000	284	249	1.141	Quarterfinals
3	Chinese Taipei	3	1	2	4	6	7	0.857	279	299	0.933	Classification 9th–16th
4	Philippines	3	0	3	0	1	9	0.111	215	252	0.853	Classification 9th–16th

Source: asiangames2026.org
Rules for classification: Tiebreakers

Date	Time		Score		Set 1	Set 2	Set 3	Set 4	Set 5	Total	Attd	Report
27 Sep	13:00	South Korea	3–0	Philippines	25–16	27–25	25–22			77–63	1,089	P2 Report
28 Sep	19:00	Chinese Taipei	1–3	South Korea	26–24	10–25	15–25	23–25		74–99	685	P2 Report
29 Sep	19:00	South Korea	2–3	China	27–25	23–25	21–25	25–22	12–15	108–112	692	P2 Report

Quarterfinals

Date	Time		Score		Set 1	Set 2	Set 3	Set 4	Set 5	Total	Attd	Report
1 Oct	13:00	South Korea	2–3	Iran	23–25	25–18	25–21	20–25	12–15	105–104	1,101	P2 Report

Classification 5th–8th

Date	Time		Score		Set 1	Set 2	Set 3	Set 4	Set 5	Total	Attd	Report
2 Oct	10:00	India	3–1	South Korea	25–16	25–20	23–25	25–23		98–84	609	P2 Report

7th place match

Date	Time		Score		Set 1	Set 2	Set 3	Set 4	Set 5	Total	Attd	Report
3 Oct	10:00	Qatar	0–3	South Korea	20–25	23–25	16–25			59–75	748	P2 Report

==== Women's tournament ====
Team roster

- Lee Ye-lim
- Kim Da-in
- Han Da-hye
- Park Eun-jin
- Na Hyun-soo
- Yuk Seo-young
- Lee Da-hyeon
- Park Eun-seo
- Jung Ho-young
- Lee Su-yeon
- Kim Hyo-im
- Kang So-hwi

Group play – Pool D

Pos	Team	Pld	W	L	Pts	SW	SL	SR	SPW	SPL	SPR	Qualification
1	South Korea	3	3	0	9	9	1	9.000	251	157	1.599	Quarterfinals
2	Vietnam	3	2	1	6	7	3	2.333	238	176	1.352	Quarterfinals
3	Hong Kong	3	1	2	3	3	6	0.500	177	179	0.989	Classification 9th–12th
4	Qatar	3	0	3	0	0	9	0.000	71	225	0.316	Classification 9th–14th

Source: asiangames2026.org
Rules for classification: Tiebreakers

Date	Time		Score		Set 1	Set 2	Set 3	Set 4	Set 5	Total	Attd	Report
16 Sep	16:00	South Korea	3–0	Hong Kong	25–23	25–12	25–12			75–47	1,420	P2 Report
17 Sep	13:00	South Korea	3–0	Qatar	25–6	25–6	25–10			75–22	1,082	P2 Report
18 Sep	16:00	Vietnam	1–3	South Korea	21–25	21–25	28–26	18–25		88–101	1,125	P2 Report

Quarterfinals

Date	Time		Score		Set 1	Set 2	Set 3	Set 4	Set 5	Total	Attd	Report
20 Sep	16:00	Kazakhstan	0–3	South Korea	24–26	25–27	21–25			70–78	1,494	P2 Report

Semifinals

Date	Time		Score		Set 1	Set 2	Set 3	Set 4	Set 5	Total	Attd	Report
21 Sep	19:20	Japan	3–0	South Korea	25–20	25–22	25–16			75–58	1,715	P2 Report

Bronze medal match

Date	Time		Score		Set 1	Set 2	Set 3	Set 4	Set 5	Total	Attd	Report
22 Sep	16:00	South Korea	0–3	Thailand	20–25	19–25	23–25			62–75	1,388	P2 Report

== Water polo ==
Summary

Team	Event	Group stage						Quarterfinal	Semifinal	Final / BM	
Team	Event	Opposition Score	Opposition Score	Opposition Score	Opposition Score	Opposition Score	Rank	Opposition Score	Opposition Score	Opposition Score	Rank
South Korea men's	Men's tournament	China; W 15–14	Singapore; PSL 14–14 (2–4 PSO)	Iran; L 11–15	—N/a		3 Q	Kazakhstan; L 14–18	5–8th place semifinals Thailand; W 22–11	Fifth place match Hong Kong; W 16–15	5

=== Men's tournament ===
Group play

Pos	Team	Pld	W	PSW	PSL	L	GF	GA	GD	Pts	Qualification
1	China	3	2	0	0	1	42	31	+11	6 (Note: Iran 8–12 China)	Quarterfinals
2	Iran	3	2	0	0	1	42	31	+11	6	Quarterfinals
3	South Korea	3	1	0	1	1	40	43	−3	4	Quarterfinals
4	Singapore	3	0	1	0	2	30	49	−19	2	Quarterfinals

Source: Groups
Notes:

26 September 2026; 14:15	Report	South Korea	15–14	China	Nippon Gaishi Hall Rainbow Pool, Nagoya; Referees: Georgios Stavridis (GRE), Shuhei Fukaya (JPN)
26 September 2026; 14:15	Report	Score by quarters: 3–1, 3–4, 4–5, 5–4			Nippon Gaishi Hall Rainbow Pool, Nagoya; Referees: Georgios Stavridis (GRE), Shuhei Fukaya (JPN)
26 September 2026; 14:15	Report	Han 4	Goals	Cai 4	Nippon Gaishi Hall Rainbow Pool, Nagoya; Referees: Georgios Stavridis (GRE), Shuhei Fukaya (JPN)

27 September 2026; 14:15	Report	South Korea	14–14; PSO: 2–4	Singapore	Nippon Gaishi Hall Rainbow Pool, Nagoya; Referees: Georgios Stavridis (GRE), Ruben Sap (NED)
27 September 2026; 14:15	Report	Score by quarters: 3–3, 1–5, 4–1, 6–5			Nippon Gaishi Hall Rainbow Pool, Nagoya; Referees: Georgios Stavridis (GRE), Ruben Sap (NED)
27 September 2026; 14:15	Report	Kwon 4	Goals	De. Chan 4	Nippon Gaishi Hall Rainbow Pool, Nagoya; Referees: Georgios Stavridis (GRE), Ruben Sap (NED)

28 September 2026; 14:15	Report	Iran	15–11	South Korea	Nippon Gaishi Hall Rainbow Pool, Nagoya; Referees: David Gómez (ESP), Alessia Ferrari (ITA)
28 September 2026; 14:15	Report	Score by quarters: 4–4, 2–2, 6–2, 3–3			Nippon Gaishi Hall Rainbow Pool, Nagoya; Referees: David Gómez (ESP), Alessia Ferrari (ITA)
28 September 2026; 14:15	Report	Shams 4	Goals	Kim S., Yong 3	Nippon Gaishi Hall Rainbow Pool, Nagoya; Referees: David Gómez (ESP), Alessia Ferrari (ITA)

Quarterfinals

29 September 2026; 17:25	Report	Kazakhstan	18–14	South Korea	Nippon Gaishi Hall Rainbow Pool, Nagoya; Referees: Georgios Stavridis (GRE), Ruben Sap (NED)
29 September 2026; 17:25	Report	Score by quarters: 4–3, 5–3, 7–4, 2–4			Nippon Gaishi Hall Rainbow Pool, Nagoya; Referees: Georgios Stavridis (GRE), Ruben Sap (NED)
29 September 2026; 17:25	Report	Ruday, Vuksanović 4	Goals	Yong 4	Nippon Gaishi Hall Rainbow Pool, Nagoya; Referees: Georgios Stavridis (GRE), Ruben Sap (NED)

5–8th place semifinals

2 October 2026; 14:15	Report	South Korea	22–11	Thailand	Nippon Gaishi Hall Rainbow Pool, Nagoya; Referees: Adil Aimbetov (KAZ), Shahriar Assar (IRI)
2 October 2026; 14:15	Report	Score by quarters: 5–4, 7–3, 5–1, 5–3			Nippon Gaishi Hall Rainbow Pool, Nagoya; Referees: Adil Aimbetov (KAZ), Shahriar Assar (IRI)
2 October 2026; 14:15	Report	Kwon 7	Goals	S. Kaewmanee 4	Nippon Gaishi Hall Rainbow Pool, Nagoya; Referees: Adil Aimbetov (KAZ), Shahriar Assar (IRI)

Fifth place game

3 October 2026; 15:50	Report	South Korea	16–15	Hong Kong	Nippon Gaishi Hall Rainbow Pool, Nagoya; Referees: Zhang Liang (CHN), Shuhei Fukaya (JPN)
3 October 2026; 15:50	Report	Score by quarters: 3–1, 6–5, 4–5, 3–4			Nippon Gaishi Hall Rainbow Pool, Nagoya; Referees: Zhang Liang (CHN), Shuhei Fukaya (JPN)
3 October 2026; 15:50	Report	Gwon 5	Goals	Cheung, Choi 4	Nippon Gaishi Hall Rainbow Pool, Nagoya; Referees: Zhang Liang (CHN), Shuhei Fukaya (JPN)

== Wrestling ==
South Korea entered twelve male and six female wrestlers.

Key:

- VT (ranking points: 5–0 or 0–5) – Victory by fall.
- VB (ranking points: 5–0 or 0–5) – Victory by injury (VF for forfeit, VA for withdrawal or disqualification)
- PP (ranking points: 3–1 or 1–3) – Decision by points – the loser with technical points.
- PO (ranking points: 3–0 or 0–3) – Decision by points – the loser without technical points.
- ST (ranking points: 4–0 or 0–4) – Great superiority – the loser without technical points and a margin of victory of at least 8 (Greco-Roman) or 10 (freestyle) points.
- SP (ranking points: 4–1 or 1–4) – Technical superiority – the loser with technical points and a margin of victory of at least 8 (Greco-Roman) or 10 (freestyle) points.

Freestyle

Athlete	Event	Round of 32	Round of 16	Quarterfinals	Semifinals	Repechage	Final / BM	
Athlete	Event	Opposition Result	Opposition Result	Opposition Result	Opposition Result	Opposition Result	Opposition Result	Rank
Kim Sung-gwon	Men's –57 kg							
Yun Jun-sik	Men's –65 kg							
Han Dae-gil	Men's –74 kg							
Lee Gyeong-yeon	Men's –86 kg							
Seo Ju-hwan	Men's –97 kg							
Kim Gwan-uk	Men's –125 kg							
Cheon Mi-ran	Women's –50 kg							
Park Seo-young	Women's –53 kg							
Kwon Young-jin	Women's –57 kg							
Jo Su-been	Women's –62 kg							
Park Hyeon-yeong	Women's –68 kg							
Hwang Eun-ju	Women's –76 kg							

Greco-Roman

Athlete	Event	Round of 16	Quarterfinals	Semifinals	Repechage	Final / BM	
Athlete	Event	Opposition Result	Opposition Result	Opposition Result	Opposition Result	Opposition Result	Rank
Kim Da-hyun	Men's −60 kg						
Chung Han-jae	Men's −67 kg						
Noh Yeong-hun	Men's −77 kg						
Lee Seung-hwan	Men's −87 kg						
Lee Min-ho	Men's −97 kg						
Kim Min-seok	Men's −130 kg						

== Wushu ==
=== Taolu ===
Men

Athlete	Event	Event 1		Event 2		Total	Rank
Athlete	Event	Result	Rank	Result	Rank	Total	Rank
Lee Yong-hyun	Changquan	9.703	6	—N/a		9.703	6
Lee Ha-sung	Daoshu & gunshu						
Kim Jin-su	Nanquan & nangun						
An Hyeon-gi	Taijiquan & taijijian	9.713	4	9.716	5	19.429	3rd place, bronze medalist(s)

Women

Athlete	Event	Event 1		Event 2		Total	Rank
Athlete	Event	Result	Rank	Result	Rank	Total	Rank
Kim Chae-young	Changquan	9.686	8	—N/a		9.686	8
Byun Si-woo	Nanquan & nandao						
Lee Min-ju	Taijiquan & taijijian	9.686	9	9.673	9	19.359	9

=== Sanda ===
Men

Athlete	Event	Round of 32	Round of 16	Quarter-finals	Semi-finals	Final	
Athlete	Event	Opposition Score	Opposition Score	Opposition Score	Opposition Score	Opposition Score	Rank
Kim Min-soo	–60 kg	—N/a	–	–	–	–	
Jung Da-jae	–65 kg	–	–	–	–	–	
Jang Sae-young	–70 kg	—N/a	Hussain (PAK); W 2–0	–	–	–	
Song Gi-cheol	–75 kg	—N/a	Bye	–	–	–	

Women

Athlete	Event	Round of 16	Quarter-finals	Semi-finals	Final	
Athlete	Event	Opposition Score	Opposition Score	Opposition Score	Opposition Score	Rank
Gwon Mun-yeong	–52 kg	Wu D (CHN); L 0–2	Did not advance			
Shin Chae-yeon	–60 kg	–	–	–	–	
