= Skateboarding at the 2026 Asian Games – Women's park =

Women's park at the 2026 Asian Games
- Venue: Aichi International Exhibition Center
- Date: 24–25 September 2026
- Competitors: 14 from 8 nations

Medalists
gold medal	Mizuho Hasegawa	Japan
silver medal	Lin Yi-fan	Chinese Taipei
bronze medal	Misugu Okamoto	Japan

The women's park competition at the 2026 Asian Games took place on 24 and 25 September 2026 at the Aichi Sky Expo Hall B in Tokoname, Aichi.

Japan's Mizuho Hasegawa, aged 15, won the gold medal with a best score of 94.03, ahead of Chinese Taipei's Lin Yi-fan (85.15) and fellow Japanese skater Misugu Okamoto (82.86).

== Schedule ==
All times are Japan Standard Time (UTC+09:00)

Date	Time	Event
Thursday, 24 September 2026	11:00	Prelims
Friday, 25 September 2026	10:00	Final

== Results ==
=== Prelims ===
Rank	Athlete	Run 1	Run 2	Run 3	Best
1	Mizuho Hasegawa (JPN)	84.52	89.15	30.80	89.15
2	Lin Yi-fan (TPE)	64.14	69.08	78.53	78.53
3	Misugu Okamoto (JPN)	72.43	5.48	74.63	74.63
4	Mazel Paris Alegado (PHI)	73.80	73.93	13.19	73.93
5	Cao Shiqi (CHN)	48.02	61.10	73.49	73.49
6	Meng Lingyan (CHN)	68.87	71.37	72.53	72.53
7	Cho Hyun-ju (KOR)	17.00	67.23	56.28	67.23
8	Gwak Min-ji (KOR)	34.85	62.19	49.77	62.19
9	Elizabeth Amador (PHI)	59.99	6.40	9.67	59.99
10	Bunga Nyimas (INA)	52.68	46.83	18.53	52.68
11	Freya Brown (THA)	41.76	33.97	18.10	41.76
12	Mikhayla Shanum Caya (INA)	36.35	16.34	28.17	36.35
13	Wong Yi Huen (HKG)	21.59	27.90	9.62	27.90
14	Wong Yeuk Ching (HKG)	20.93	24.82	27.75	27.75

=== Final ===
Rank	Athlete	Run 1	Run 2	Run 3	Run 4	Best
1st place, gold medalist(s)	Mizuho Hasegawa (JPN)	88.83	94.03	42.75	58.67	94.03
2nd place, silver medalist(s)	Lin Yi-fan (TPE)	85.15	61.17	60.23	28.83	85.15
3rd place, bronze medalist(s)	Misugu Okamoto (JPN)	14.28	82.86	34.46	53.13	82.86
4	Cao Shiqi (CHN)	73.03	20.83	72.74	81.23	81.23
5	Mazel Paris Alegado (PHI)	70.81	80.19	1.67	80.65	80.65
6	Meng Lingyan (CHN)	63.69	52.89	28.83		63.69
7	Cho Hyun-ju (KOR)	6.67	9.20	54.83		54.83
8	Gwak Min-ji (KOR)	41.00	2.56	40.30		41.00
