= Skateboarding at the 2025 SEA Games =

- Venue: Extreme Park, Huamark Sports Complex
- Location: Bang Kapi, Bangkok, Thailand
- Dates: 10–14 December 2025

Skateboarding competition at the 2025 SEA Games took place from 10 to 14 December 2025 at Extreme Park, Huamark Sports Complex in Bang Kapi, Bangkok, Thailand. This marks the second time that skateboarding has featured in the SEA Games, following its inclusion in the 2019 edition.

== Medal table ==
* Host nation (Thailand)

Rank	Nation	Gold	Silver	Bronze	Total
1	Philippines (PHI)	2	1	0	3
2	Thailand (THA)*	1	2	4	7
3	Indonesia (INA)	1	1	0	2
Totals (3 entries)		4	4	4	12

== Medalists ==
=== Men ===
Event	Gold	Silver	Bronze
Street	Basral Graito Hutomo; Indonesia	Kirin Petkiree; Thailand	Thawatchai Siangoueng; Thailand
Park	Kiko Francisco; Philippines	Konwit Ketkaeo; Thailand	Brian Van Upapong; Thailand

=== Women ===
Event	Gold	Silver	Bronze
Street	Chunkao Udomphen; Thailand	Ni Wayan Malana Fairbrother; Indonesia	Vareeraya Sukasem; Thailand
Park	Mazel Paris Alegado; Philippines	Elizabeth Amador; Philippines	Freya Sariya Brown; Thailand
