= Izuru Nagahara =

Japanese skateboarder (born 2011)

Personal information
- Native name: 永原依弦
- Born: 19 July 2011 (age 15)

Sport
- Country: Japan
- Sport: Skateboarding
- Position: Goofy-footed
- Event: Park
Medal record
Men's skateboarding
Representing Japan
Asian Games
Gold medal – first place	2026 Aichi–Nagoya	Park

Izuru Nagahara (永原依弦, Nagahara Izuru; born 19 July 2011) is a Japanese skateboarder.

== Career ==
In September 2026, Nagahara competed at the 2026 Asian Games and won a gold medal in the park event with a score of 88.96.

== Personal life ==
Nagahara's older brother, Yuro Nagahara, is also a skateboarder who represented Japan at the 2024 Summer Olympics.
