= Mizuho Hasegawa =

Japanese skateboarder (born 2010)

Personal information
- Native name: 長谷川 瑞穂
- Nickname: Meeko
- Born: 14 October 2010 (age 16)

Sport
- Country: Japan
- Sport: Skateboarding
- Position: Regular-footed
- Events: Vert, park
Medal record
Women's skateboarding
Representing Japan
World Championships
| Silver medal – second place | 2024 Rome | Vert |
| Silver medal – second place | 2025 São Paulo | Park |
World Skate Games
| Gold medal – first place | 2026 Asunción | Vert |
| Gold medal – first place | 2026 Asunción | Park |
Asian Games
| Gold medal – first place | 2026 Aichi–Nagoya | Park |
X Games
| Gold medal – first place | 2025 Salt Lake City | Vert |
| Gold medal – first place | 2026 Chiba | Vert |
| Gold medal – first place | 2026 New Orleans | Vert |
| Silver medal – second place | 2023 California | Park |
| Silver medal – second place | 2024 Ventura | Vert |
| Silver medal – second place | 2024 Ventura | Vert Best Trick |
| Silver medal – second place | 2025 Salt Lake City | Vert Best Trick |
| Silver medal – second place | 2026 Chiba | Park |
| Silver medal – second place | 2026 Chiba | Vert Best Trick |
| Silver medal – second place | 2026 Sacramento | Vert |
| Silver medal – second place | 2026 Sacramento | Vert Best Trick |
| Silver medal – second place | 2026 New Orleans | Park |
| Bronze medal – third place | 2026 New Orleans | Vert Best Trick |

Mizuho Hasegawa (長谷川 瑞穂, Hasegawa Mizuho; born 14 October 2010) is a Japanese skateboarder. She is a two-time World Skateboarding Championship silver medalist.

== Career ==
During the first leg of the 2024 Olympic Qualifier Series in Shanghai, Hasegawa was ranked first in the semifinals of the Olympic Qualifier Series with a score of 84.04. During the finals, she finished in fifth place with a score of 86.20. Following the Olympic Qualifier Series she was ranked sixth in the world street skateboarding rankings, however, Japan already met its quota of three skaters, and as a result she didn't qualify for the 2024 Summer Olympics.

In September 2024, she competed at the World Skateboarding Championship. During the open qualifier round of the vert competition, she had the second-highest score of 80.93 points. During the finals she won a silver medal with a score of 217.77. Weeks later, she then competed in the park competition. During the open qualifier round, she finished in eighth place with a score of 61.00. During the quarterfinals she finished in sixth place with a score of 80.77 and advanced to the finals. During the finals she finished in fifth place with a score of 86.45.

In June 2026, she competed at the World Skateboarding Tour (WST) World Cup Rome and won a gold medal with a score of 96.33, setting a record for the highest women's park score in WST history.

During the inaugural X Games League (XGL) summer season she won two gold medals, five silver medals and a bronze medal in nine events. Her eight X Games medals were the most by any athlete in a calendar year. She finished the season with 680 points and was subsequently named XGL MVP.

In September 2026, she competed at the 2026 Asian Games and won a gold medal in the park event with a score of 94.03. The next month she competed at the 2026 World Skate Games and won a gold medal in the vert event with a score of 259.66. She also won a gold medal in the park event with a score of 91.00.
