= Skateboarding at the 2026 Asian Games – Men's park =

Men's park at the 2026 Asian Games
- Venue: Aichi International Exhibition Center
- Date: 24–25 September 2026
- Competitors: 13 from 8 nations

Medalists
gold medal	Izuru Nagahara	Japan
silver medal	Ku Yong-yan	Chinese Taipei
bronze medal	Gunjo Shiji	Japan

The men's park competition at the 2026 Asian Games took place on 24 and 25 September 2026 at the Aichi Sky Expo Hall B in Tokoname, Aichi.

Japan's Izuru Nagahara, aged 15, won the gold medal with a best score of 88.96, ahead of Chinese Taipei's Ku Yong-yan and fellow Japanese skater Gunjo Shiji.

== Schedule ==
All times are Japan Standard Time (UTC+09:00)

Date	Time	Event
Thursday, 24 September 2026	15:00	Prelims
Friday, 25 September 2026	12:30	Final

== Results ==
=== Prelims ===
Rank	Athlete	Run 1	Run 2	Run 3	Best
1	Gunjo Shiji (JPN)	88.59	49.26	38.53	88.59
2	Ku Yong-yan (TPE)	63.97	35.95	83.73	83.73
3	Izuru Nagahara (JPN)	51.07	82.00	83.50	83.50
4	Kiko Francisco (PHI)	80.64	66.53	79.89	80.64
5	Lee Ro-un (KOR)	67.84	76.42	40.60	76.42
6	Chen Ye (CHN)	75.48	39.50	64.27	75.48
7	Kim Dong-hyeok (KOR)	73.19	74.14	2.53	74.14
8	Gu Jiahuan (HKG)	70.34	53.85	64.38	70.34
9	Konwit Ketkaeo (THA)	46.00	52.71	45.67	52.71
10	Wu Bowen (CHN)	15.67	46.72	50.04	50.04
11	Brian Upapong (THA)	47.00	25.48	31.80	47.00
12	Li Pak Lam (HKG)	42.34	46.50	22.23	46.50
13	Firdausy Nuzula Putra Hartanto (INA)	44.72	20.53	45.65	45.65

=== Final ===
Rank	Athlete	Run 1	Run 2	Run 3	Run 4	Best
1st place, gold medalist(s)	Izuru Nagahara (JPN)	87.33	88.96	53.56	20.99	88.96
2nd place, silver medalist(s)	Ku Yong-yan (TPE)	70.50	27.33	26.30	87.33	87.33
3rd place, bronze medalist(s)	Gunjo Shiji (JPN)	30.83	86.03	69.77	69.50	86.03
4	Kiko Francisco (PHI)	83.19	78.93	84.41	2.00	84.41
5	Kim Dong-hyeok (KOR)	3.77	72.21	3.00	20.67	72.21
6	Lee Ro-un (KOR)	27.22	64.00	65.55		65.55
7	Gu Jiahuan (HKG)	25.00	61.11	37.17		61.11
8	Chen Ye (CHN)	20.00	41.85	49.12		49.12
