= Ginwoo Onodera =

Japanese professional skateboarder

Personal information
- Native name: 小野寺 吟雲
- Nickname: Ginwoo
- Born: Gin'u Onodera; 15 February 2010 (age 16) Yokohama, Kanagawa, Japan

Sport
- Country: Japan
- Sport: Skateboarding
- Position: Regular-footed
- Rank: 1st – street (August 2024)
Medal record
Men's street skateboarding
Representing Japan
World Championships
Bronze medal – third place	2022 Sharjah	Street
World Skate Games (Note: Both World Championships and World Skate Games represent skateboarding world titles by the World Skate (WS).)
Gold medal – first place	2026 Asunción	Street
Street League Skateboarding (SLS)
Gold medal – first place	2025 Las Vegas	Street
Gold medal – first place	2025 São Paulo (F)	Street
Gold medal – first place	2026 Sydney	Street
Asian Games
Bronze medal – third place	2026 Aichi–Nagoya	Street
X Games
Gold medal – first place	2023 Chiba	Street
Gold medal – first place	2026 Chiba	Street
Gold medal – first place	2026 Sacramento	Street
Silver medal – second place	2026 Sacramento	Street Best Trick
Bronze medal – third place	2024 Chiba	Street
Bronze medal – third place	2025 Osaka	Street
Bronze medal – third place	2026 Chiba	Street Best Trick

Gin'u "Ginwoo" Onodera (小野寺 吟雲, Onodera Gin'u; born 15 February 2010) is a Japanese skateboarder. He represented Japan at the 2024 Summer Olympics.

== Career ==
Onodera won the gold medal at the men's street skateboarding competition at X Games 2023.

He also won a bronze medal at the World Skateboarding Championship in 2023, and the year before became Japan's youngest national champion at the age of twelve.

Onodera was part of Japan's men's street skateboarding team for the 2024 Summer Olympics.

In December 2025, he won his first SLS Men's Super Crown Championship, at the age of fifteen.

In September 2026, Onodera earned a bronze medal at the Asian Games in Aichi, Japan.

The following month, he won his first world title in men's street at the V World Skate Games edition, held in Asunción, Paraguay.
