= Kiko Francisco =

Filipino skateboarder

Personal information
- Born: Jericho Jojit Francisco Jr. December 7, 2001 (age 24) Torrance, California, U.S.
- Home town: Carson, California

Sport
- Country: Philippines
- Sport: Skateboarding
- Style: Park
- Now coaching: Mazel Paris Alegado
Achievements and titles
Men's skateboard
Representing Philippines
SEA Games
Gold medal – first place	2019 Philippines	Park
Gold medal – first place	2025 Thailand	Park

Jericho "Kiko" Jojit Francisco Jr. is a Filipino skateboarder and coach.

== Career ==
=== Competitive skateboarding ===
Kiko Francisco has been skateboarding at an early age. In 2010, he has been frequenting at the Venice Beach Skatepark and has competed in the annual skate competition alongside adults.

He has represent the Philippines officially for the first time during the 2019 SEA Games. He won a gold medal in the men's park event.

Francisco competed at the 2022 Asian Games in Hangzhou, China in September 2023 although he failed to make a podium finish.

Francisco made an attempt to qualify for the 2024 Summer Olympics in Paris and reached the second phase of the Olympic Qualification System.

At the 2025 SEA Games in Thailand, Francisco earned his second overall SEA Games gold medal by winning by men's park event.

In September 2026, Francisco joined the 2026 Asian Games in Aichi and Nagoya, Japan. He finished fourth in the men's park.

=== Coaching ===
Francisco runs First Class Skate, a coaching business around 2022. Among his students is Mazel Paris Alegado, who is also a fellow Asian Games competitor.

== Personal life ==
Jericho "Kiko" Francisco Jr. was born on December 7, 2001, to Filipino parents Jericho Sr. and Brenda Francisco. His father immigrated to the Philippines in the 1980s, while his mother traces her roots to San Carlos, Pangasinan. Francisco was born in Torrance, California, but Carson is his hometown. His father introduced him to skateboarding when he was four years old.
