= Misugu Okamoto =

Japanese skateboarder (born 2006)

Personal information
- Native name: 岡本碧優
- Born: 22 June 2006 (age 20) Takahama, Aichi, Japan

Sport
- Country: Japan
- Sport: Skateboarding
- Position: Regular-footed
- Rank: 1st (June 2021)
- Event: Park

Achievements and titles
- Olympic finals: 2020 Summer Olympics: Women's park – 4th
Medal record
Women's park skateboarding
Representing Japan
World Championships
| Gold medal – first place | 2019 São Paulo | Park |
Asian Games
| Bronze medal – third place | 2026 Aichi–Nagoya | Park |
X Games
| Gold medal – first place | 2019 Minneapolis | Park |

Misugu Okamoto (岡本 碧優, Okamoto Misugu; born 22 June 2006) is a Japanese skateboarder. She won the gold at the women's park event at the World Skateboarding Championship in 2019 and, in 2021, she qualified to represent Japan at the 2020 Summer Olympics.

== Biography ==
Okamoto was born in Takahama, Aichi. Aged 13, she won the World Skate World Park Championship in 2019, and also won another three Olympic qualifying events. In November 2019, she became the first skater to land a kickflip Indy in women's competition.

In 2021, it was announced that Okamoto had qualified for the Women's Park skateboarding competition at the 2020 Summer Olympics. She finished fourth in the event, after falling on her final run.
