= Toa Sasaki =

Japanese skateboarder (born 2007)

Personal information
- Born: 28 February 2007 (age 19)

Sport
- Country: Japan
- Sport: Skateboarding
- Position: Regular-footed
- Event: Street
Medal record
Men's street skateboarding
Representing Japan
World Championships
Gold medal – first place	2024 Rome	Street
Gold medal – first place	2025 São Paulo	Street
Asian Games
Silver medal – second place	2026 Aichi–Nagoya	Street

Toa Sasaki (born 28 February 2007) is a Japanese skateboarder. He is a two-time World Skateboarding Championship gold medalist.

== Career ==
Following the 2024 Olympic Qualifier Series, Sasaki was ranked in the top-ten of the world street skateboarding rankings, however, Japan already met its quota of three skaters, and as a result he didn't qualify for the 2024 Summer Olympics.

In September 2024, he competed at the World Skateboarding Championship. During the quarterfinals, he finished in 13th place with a score of 56.06. During the semifinals he finished in seventh place with a score of 234.00 and advanced to the finals. During the finals he won a gold medal with a score of 276.64, finishing over 11 points ahead of silver medalist Matías Dell Olio.

He competed at the 2025 World Skateboarding Championship, which were postponed until March 2026, and won a gold medal in the street event with a score of 83.90. In September 2026, he competed at the 2026 Asian Games and won a silver medal in the street event with a score of 172.35.
