= Skateboarding at the 2026 Asian Games – Men's street =

Men's street at the 2026 Asian Games
- Venue: Aichi International Exhibition Center
- Date: 26–27 September 2026
- Competitors: 17 from 9 nations

Medalists
gold medal	Kang Jun-i	South Korea
silver medal	Toa Sasaki	Japan
bronze medal	Ginwoo Onodera	Japan

The men's street competition at the 2026 Asian Games took place on 26 and 27 September 2026 at the Aichi Sky Expo Hall B in Tokoname, Aichi.

South Korea's 17-year-old Kang Jun-i won the gold medal with a total of 180.85 points, the country's first Asian Games gold in skateboarding, ahead of Japan's Toa Sasaki (172.35) and Ginwoo Onodera (168.11).

== Schedule ==
All times are Japan Standard Time (UTC+09:00)

Date	Time	Event
Saturday, 26 September 2026	15:00	Prelims
Sunday, 27 September 2026	14:00	Final

== Results ==
Legend

- DNS — Did not start

=== Prelims ===
Rank	Athlete	Run		Trick			Total
Rank	Athlete	1	2	1	2	3	Total
1	Toa Sasaki (JPN)	~~63.23~~	73.97	~~0.00~~	85.16	~~0.00~~	159.13
2	Ginwoo Onodera (JPN)	~~71.76~~	72.11	~~83.66~~	86.33	~~0.00~~	158.44
3	Kang Jun-i (KOR)	~~68.98~~	71.18	~~84.06~~	85.99	~~0.00~~	157.17
4	Basral Graito Hutomo (INA)	62.92	~~41.38~~	~~72.79~~	81.96	~~0.00~~	144.88
5	Lin Honghao (CHN)	~~41.84~~	44.98	~~0.00~~	~~67.42~~	76.43	121.41
6	Lee Jun-seung (KOR)	~~8.66~~	41.29	~~66.61~~	71.77	~~0.00~~	113.06
7	Thawatchai Siangoueng (THA)	36.35	~~16.55~~	72.66	~~0.00~~	~~0.00~~	109.01
8	Kirin Petkiree (THA)	35.50	DNS	~~0.00~~	~~0.00~~	67.71	103.21
9	Mak Feliciano (PHI)	38.59	~~19.28~~	59.34	~~0.00~~	~~0.00~~	97.93
10	Renz Gelig (PHI)	~~36.96~~	39.24	~~0.00~~	~~0.00~~	58.32	97.56
11	Sanggoe Darma Tanjung (INA)	30.29	~~29.64~~	59.31	~~0.00~~	~~0.00~~	89.60
12	Alfiruz Eshmatov (KAZ)	17.25	~~1.89~~	51.76	~~0.00~~	~~0.00~~	69.01
13	Sharad Kumar Rai (NEP)	14.71	~~13.31~~	~~0.00~~	45.13	~~0.00~~	59.84
14	Gajendra Bardewa (NEP)	~~9.40~~	9.66	~~0.00~~	43.18	~~0.00~~	52.84
15	Nurayat Anuarbek (KAZ)	7.68	~~4.84~~	~~0.00~~	36.70	~~0.00~~	44.38
16	Chen Yuxuan (CHN)	~~18.51~~	32.57	0.00	~~0.00~~	~~0.00~~	32.57
17	Arian Estehmami (IRI)	~~15.55~~	15.61	0.00	~~0.00~~	~~0.00~~	15.61

=== Final ===
Rank	Athlete	Run			Trick			Total
Rank	Athlete	1	2	3	1	2	3	Total
1st place, gold medalist(s)	Kang Jun-i (KOR)	~~84.83~~	~~69.79~~	88.45	~~0.00~~	~~0.00~~	92.40	180.85
2nd place, silver medalist(s)	Toa Sasaki (JPN)	~~1.03~~	84.30	~~19.72~~	88.05	~~0.00~~	~~0.00~~	172.35
3rd place, bronze medalist(s)	Ginwoo Onodera (JPN)	80.72	~~35.36~~	~~34.80~~	87.39	~~0.00~~	~~0.00~~	168.11
4	Basral Graito Hutomo (INA)	~~49.41~~	~~39.43~~	69.31	~~0.00~~	82.10	~~0.00~~	151.41
5	Lee Jun-seung (KOR)	~~11.87~~	~~8.26~~	41.36	83.59	~~0.00~~	~~0.00~~	124.95
6	Thawatchai Siangoueng (THA)	~~8.59~~	~~28.33~~	40.31	72.44	~~0.00~~	~~0.00~~	112.75
7	Kirin Petkiree (THA)	~~18.69~~	39.71	~~19.50~~	~~0.00~~	~~0.00~~	67.68	107.39
8	Lin Honghao (CHN)	~~21.16~~	~~35.46~~	46.38	0.00	~~0.00~~	~~DNS~~	46.38
