= Juni Kang =

South Korean skateboarder (born 2008)

Personal information
- Native name: 강준이
- Born: 29 September 2008 (age 18)

Sport
- Country: South Korea
- Sport: Skateboarding
- Event: Street
Medal record
Men's street skateboarding
Representing South Korea
Asian Games
Gold medal – first place	2026 Aichi–Nagoya	Street
World Skate Games
Silver medal – second place	2026 Asunción	Street
X Games
Gold medal – first place	2026 Sacramento	Street best trick
Gold medal – first place	2026 Chiba	Street best trick
Gold medal – first place	2026 New Orleans	Street best trick
Silver medal – second place	2025 Osaka	Street
Silver medal – second place	2026 Chiba	Street
Bronze medal – third place	2026 Sacramento	Street

Juni Kang (Korean: 강준이; born 29 September 2008) is a South Korean skateboarder.

== Career ==
Kang began skateboarding at eight years old. He was named to the Korean national team in 2021 and trained for the 2022 Asian Games, however, he suffered a patella fracture in May 2022 and missed the competition.

He competed at the 2024 Tampa Am and became the first Korean to win the event. He made his X Games debut at the 2025 X Games Osaka and won a silver medal, becoming the first Korean skateboard medalist at the X Games.

On 4 April 2026, he made his Street League Skateboarding (SLS) debut and became the first Korean to win the SLS. He became the first skater to win the SLS in their debut since Ginwoo Onodera.

In June 2026, he made his X Games League (XGL) debut in Sacramento, California, and won a gold medal in the street best trick event and a bronze medal in the street contest. During the next XGL stop in Chiba, he won a gold medal in the street best trick event and a silver medal in the street contest.

In September 2026, he competed at the 2026 Asian Games and won a gold medal in the street event with a score of 180.85 points. This was South Korea's first gold medal in skateboarding at the Asian Games. The next month he competed at the 2026 World Skate Games and won a silver medal in the street event.
