= Mazel Paris Alegado =

Filipino skateboarder

Personal information
- Nationality: Filipino
- Born: 2013 or 2014 (age 11–12)
- Home town: Fontana, California

Sport
- Country: Philippines
- Sport: Skateboarding
- Event: Park
- Coached by: Kiko Francisco
Medal record
Skateboarding
Southeast Asian Games
Gold medal – first place	2025 Bangkok	Park

Mazel Paris Alegado (born 2013/2014) is a Filipino skateboarder. She is best known for winning the gold medal in the women's park skateboarding event at the 2025 Southeast Asian Games. At the age of 11, she became the youngest Filipino athlete to win a gold medal in the history of the Southeast Asian Games. She previously represented the Philippines at the 2022 Asian Games, where she was the country's youngest delegate.

== Early life ==
Mazel Paris Alegado was born around 2013 or 2014. She is based in California, United States, specifically in Fontana. She began skateboarding at the age of five. Her interest in the sport started when she saw her older brother skateboarding at a cousin's house and asked to try it. Her mother, Pauline Cristianne Constantino, initially enrolled her in ballet and cheerleading but supported her transition to skateboarding after seeing her dedication. Alegado trains in the United States and has also traveled to Portugal for training preparations.

== Career ==
=== 2023–2024: Early competitions ===
In September 2023, Alegado competed at the 19th Asian Games held in Hangzhou, China. At nine years old, she was the youngest member of the Philippine national team. She qualified for the women's park final, where she finished in seventh place with a score of 52.85.

In January 2024, she participated in the California Amateur Skate League (CASL) National Championship. She won the gold medal in the Girl Park Open Advanced category with a score of 86 points. She defeated American competitors in the final round of the event.

=== 2025: Southeast Asian Games gold ===
In June 2025, Alegado advanced to the quarterfinals of the World Skateboarding Tour held in Ostia, Italy. She finished 24th in the Women's Open standings with a total score of 65.20. In November 2025, she won first place at the 2025 Skate Women’s Bowl Open Pro Finals in Encinitas, California.

Alegado represented the Philippines at the 33rd Southeast Asian Games in Thailand in December 2025. She competed in the women's extreme skateboarding park event held at the SAT Extreme Sports Park in Bangkok. She won the gold medal with a score of 79.72. Her teammate, 11-year-old Elizabeth Amador, won the silver medal, while Thailand's Freya Sariya Brown took the bronze.

With this victory, Alegado set a record as the youngest Filipino gold medalist in the history of the SEA Games. She was 11 years old at the time of the win. Her coach at the event was Kiko Francisco, who also won a gold medal in the men's skateboarding event.
