= List of Indian skaters =

The following is a list of notable Indian figure, inline, roller and speed skaters.

== Figure skating ==
Skaters in bold have represented India in senior international competitions

=== Women ===
- Aadnya Borkar
- **Ami Parekh**
- Avani Panchal
- Hounsh Munshi
- **Yoniko Eva Washington**
- Candida Damietta Fernandes
- Anavi Tekriwal
- Shreya Saha Dalal
- Aldrin Elizabeth Mathew
- Ananya Murthy Thiruvallam
- Arunima Verabelli
- Ishita Kapoor
- Harshita Rawtani
- **Tara Prasad**
- **Parrii Srohi**
- Aanya Singh
- Tanishi Krishna
- Abrysha Srivastava

=== Men ===
- Amar Mehta
- Andrew Fernandes
- **Anup Kumar Yama**
- **Nikhil Pingle**
- Nishchay Luthra
- Priyam Tated
- **Manjesh Tiwari**
- Arush Tiwari

== Roller skating ==
- Anup Kumar Yama
- Avani Bharath Panchal
- Rayudu Arun Kumar

== Speed skating ==
- Govind Gupta
- Sarvesh Amte
- Jayesh Bugad
- Shruti Kotwal
- Aarthy Kasturi
- Heeral Sadhu
- Karthika Jagadeeshwaran
- Sanjana Bathula

== Notes ==
1. Born in the United States, also represented the United States
2. Born in the United States
3. Born in Thailand
4. Born in Oman, competed locally in the United States
5. Competed locally in Oman
6. Born in Taiwan
7. Born in Singapore
