= Ice Skating Association of India =

Indian national sports governing body

- Sport: Ice skating
- Category: Figure skating, synchronized skating, speed skating, and short track speed skating
- Jurisdiction: India
- Membership: 23 state/UT associations 4 skating clubs
- Abbreviation: ISAI
- Founded: March 2002; 23 years ago
- Affiliation: International Skating Union
- Affiliation date: 2003
- Regional affiliation: Asian Skating Union
- Headquarters: 7/19, Ansari Road, Daryaganj, New Delhi
- President: Amitabh Sharma
- Vice president(s): S.C . Narang; Bhavnesh Banga; Shabir Ahmad Wani
- Secretary: Jagraj Singh Sahney

Official website
- www.iceskatingindia.in
- (India)

The Ice Skating Association of India (ISAI) is the national governing body for competitive ice skating disciplines, including figure skating, synchronized skating, speed skating, and short track speed skating in India. The ISAI is affiliated to the International Skating Union, and the Asian Skating Union.

== History ==
The Ice Skating Association of India was registered with the Registrar of Societies in March 2002 based on the advice of Randhir Singh, Secretary General of the Indian Olympic Association (IOA) and then IOA President Suresh Kalmadi. Prior to the establishment of the ISAI, the sport was governed by the Winter Games Federation of India as it was a winter sport. The IOA felt that the creation of a separate national federation would help encourage the growth of the sport in the country.

== Competitions ==
- Indian Figure Skating Championships

== Rinks ==
The ISAI operates 4 indoor and 5 outdoor ice rinks in India.

=== Indoor ===
==== All weather ====
- Himadri Ice Rink, Dehradun, Uttarakhand
- iSkate, Ambience Mall, Gurgaon, Haryana

==== Minor ====
- Ice Rink, EsselWorld, Mumbai, Maharashtra
- Lulu Ice Skating Rink, Kochi, Kerala

=== Outdoor ===
- Shimla Ice Skating Rink, Shimla, Himachal Pradesh
- Ice Rink, Gulmarg, Jammu and Kashmir
- Ice Rink, Leh, Ladakh
- Ice Rink, Kargil, Ladakh
- Ice Rink, Kaza, Himachal Pradesh
