= Indian Figure Skating Championships =

Recurring national figure skating competition

- Status: Active
- Genre: National championships
- Frequency: Annual
- Country: India
- Organiser: Ice Skating Association of India

The Indian Figure Skating Championships is a figure skating competition held annually to determine the national champions of India when participating in international sporting events. Skaters compete in the disciplines of men's singles, women' singles, pair skating, and ice dancing. The event is organized by Ice Skating Association of India, the sport's national governing body.

== Senior medalists ==
=== Men's singles ===
Men's event medalists
Season	Location	Gold	Silver	Bronze	Ref.
2002–03	New Delhi	(No records found)			
2003–04	New Delhi	(No records found)			
2004–05	New Delhi	Yogesh Trivedi	Vasudev Tandi	Chandan Kumar	
2005–06	Kolkata	Vasudev Tandi	Yogesh Trivedi	Randeep Rai	
2006–07	No competition held				
2007–08	Shimla	Pranay Kumar Jain	Anup Kumar Yama	Vasudev Tandi	
2008–09	Shimla	(No records found)			
2009–10	No competition held				
2010–11	Shimla	Vasudev Tandi	Yogesh Trivedi	Ankit Banga	
2011–12	Shimla	Anup Kumar Yama	Surya Uday Minocha	Abhishek Barowalia	
2012–13	Shimla	Anup Kumar Yama	Vasudev Tandi	Gurmeet Singh Sidhu	
2013–14	Shimla	Anup Kumar Yama	Yogesh Gupta	Jogender Kumar	
2014–15	New Delhi	Anup Kumar Yama	Raj Kumar Tiwari	Aashu Singh	
2015–16	Gulmarg	Anup Kumar Yama	Nishchay Luthra	Raj Kumar Tiwari	
2016–17	New Delhi	Anup Kumar Yama	Raj Kumar Tiwari	Mohammed Haseen	
2017–18	New Delhi	Anup Kumar Yama	Ch Sree Ram	Chander Bhan	
2018–19	New Delhi	Pratham Tated	Vansh Bhatia	Mohammed Haseen	
2019–20	New Delhi	Arun Kumar	Priyam Tated	Vyshnav Nair	
2020–21	No competition held				
2021–22	Gurugram	Priyam Tated	Vyshnav Nair		
2022–23	Gurugram	Vyshnav Nair			
2023–24	No competition held				
2024–25	Gurugram	Priyam Tated	Vishal Anand Mutyala	Manit Singh	
2025–26	Dehradun	Manjesh Tiwari	Jatin Sehrawat	Vishal Anand Mutyala	
2026–27	Dehradun	Manjesh Tiwari	No other competitors		

=== Women's singles ===
Women's event medalists
Season	Location	Gold	Silver	Bronze	Ref.
2002–03	New Delhi	Aadnya Borkar	(No records found)		
2003–04	New Delhi	Aadnya Borkar	(No records found)		
2004–05	New Delhi	Aadnya Borkar	Sonam Tsomo	Avantika Vaishnav	
2005–06	Kolkata	Aadnya Borkar	Rinchen Dolma	Khushboo Saini	
2006–07	No competition held				
2007–08	Shimla	Mayuri Bhandari	Yoniko Eva Washington	Hounsh Munshi	
2008–09	Shimla	(No records found)			
2009–10	No competition held				
2010–11	Shimla	Simrita Sahney	Japneet Sidhu	Ibani Kaundal	
2011–12	Shimla	Simrita Sahney	Japneet Sidhu	Sunidhi Chanana	
2012–13	Shimla	Avani Panchal & Simrita Sahney (tied)	Suchali Sharma	Mansi Limaye	
2013–14	Shimla	Manal Kanojia	Suchali Sharma	Japneet Sidhu	
2014–15	New Delhi	Aldrin Mathew	Manal Kanojia	Suchali Sharma	
2015–16	Gulmarg	Aldrin Mathew	Nishtha Painuli	Sarah Ayaz	
2016–17	New Delhi	Divya Tated	Aldrin Mathew	Nishtha Painuli	
2017–18	New Delhi	Aldrin Mathew	Kavya Jayesh Shah	Ashmin Kaur Chandok	
2018–19	New Delhi	Simran Chugh	Aldrin Mathew	Kavya Jayesh Shah	
2019–20	New Delhi	Parrii Srohi	Simran Chugh	Elisetty Pallavi	
2020–21	No competition held				
2021–22	Gurugram	Tara Prasad	Simran Chugh	Parrii Srohi	
2022–23	Gurugram	Tara Prasad	Gauri Rai		
2023–24	No competition held				
2024–25	Gurugram	Tara Prasad	Chelsi Singh	Kashish Sharma	
2025–26	Dehradun	Harshita Rawtani	Chelsi Singh	Tanishka Singh	
2026–27	Dehradun	Tara Prasad	No other competitors		

=== Pairs ===
Pairs event medalists
Season	Location	Gold	Silver	Bronze	Ref.
No pairs competitors prior to 2010–11
2010–11	Shimla	Simrita Sahney; Yogesh Trivedi	Ibani Kaundal; Ankit Banga	No other competitors	
2011–12	Shimla	Manal Kanojia; Anup Kumar Yama	Surya Uday Minocha; Sheffali Sharma	No other competitors	
2012–13	Shimla	Avani Panchal; Anup Kumar Yama	Nishtha Painuli; Yogeshi Trivedi	Mansi Limaye; Yogesh Gupta	
2013–14	Shimla	Manal Kanojia; Anup Kumar Yama	Deepika Aggarwal; Yogesh Gupta	Ridhima; Divyank	
2014–15	New Delhi	Manal Kanojia; Anup Kumar Yama	Aldrin Mathew; Aashu Singh	No other competitors	
2015–16	Gulmarg	Aldrin Mathew; Nishchay Luthra	Nishtha Painuli; Raj Kumar Tiwari	Madha Talat; Hari Om Mishra	
2016–18	New Delhi	No pairs competitors			
2018–19	New Delhi	S.S.S. Swetha; Pratham Tated	Kavya Jayesh Shah; P.D. Senthil Kumar	Ashmin Kaur; Mohammed Haseen	
2019–20	New Delhi	Aanya Singh; Manit Singh	Harshita Rawtani; Vansh Bhatia	Gauri Rai; Simar Bajaj	
2020–21	No competition held				
2021–22	Gurugram	No pairs competitors			
2022–23	Gurugram	No pairs competitors			
2023–24	No competition held				
2024–25	Gurugram	No pairs competitors			
2025–26	Dehradun	No pairs competitors			

=== Ice dance ===
Ice dance event medalists
Season	Location	Gold	Silver	Bronze	Ref.
No ice dance competitors prior to 2015–16
2015–16	Gulmarg	Aldrin Mathew; Nishchay Luthra	Nishtha Painuli; Raj Kumar Tiwari	Madha Talat; Hari Om Mishra	
2016–17	New Delhi	Aldrin Mathew; Anup Kumar Yama	Divya Tated; Mohammed Haseen	Nishtha Painuli; P.D. Senthil Kumar	
2017–18	New Delhi	Aldrin Mathew; Anup Kumar Yama	Sri Sai Shweta; Ch Sree Ram	Mehek Bothra; P.D. Senthil Kumar	
2018–19	New Delhi	S.S.S. Swetha; Pratham Tated	Kavya Jayesh Shah; P.D. Senthil Kumar	Ashmin Kaur; Mohammed Haseen	
2019–20	New Delhi	Snah; Priyam Tated	Ashmin Kaur Chandok; Vaishnav Nair	Sanskriti Goyal; Jatin Sherawat	
2020–21	No competition held				
2021–22	Gurugram	No ice dance competitors			
2022–23	Gurugram	No ice dance competitors			
2023–24	No competition held				
2024–25	Gurugram	No ice dance competitors			
2025–26	Dehradun	No ice dance competitors			
