= 2021–22 national figure skating championships =

- Type: National championship
- Season: 2021–22
- Host: ISU member nations
- Previous: 2020–21
- Next: 2022–23

National figure skating championships for the 2021–22 season took place mainly from December 2021 to January 2022. They were held to crown national champions and to serve as part of the selection process for international events, such as the 2022 ISU Championships and the 2022 Winter Olympics. Medals were awarded in the disciplines of men's singles, women's singles, pairs, and ice dance. A few countries choose to organize their national championships together with their neighbors; the results were subsequently divided into national podiums.

== Competitions ==
Competition schedules are subject to change due to the ongoing global COVID-19 pandemic.

Key

Nationals	Other domestic

Date	Event	Type	Level	Disc.	Location	Results
2021
October 1–3	Master's de Patinage	Other	Sen.–Jun.	All	Épinal, France	
November 13–14	Chinese Taipei Championships	Nat.	Sen.–Nov.	M/W	Taipei, Taiwan (Chinese Taipei)	
November 17–18	Mexican Championships	Nat.	Sen.–Nov.	M/W	Naucalpan, Mexico	
November 19–20	Belgian Championships	Nat.	Sen.–Nov. Novice	W M	Leuven, Belgium	
November 19–21	Icelandic Championships	Nat.	Sen.-Nov.	W	Reykjavík, Iceland	
November 19–21	Japan Junior Champ.	Nat.	Junior	M/W/D	Nagoya, Japan	
November 26–28	Turkish Championships	Nat.	Sen.–Jun.	M/W	Samsun, Turkey	
November 26–28	Bulgarian Championships	Nat.	Sen.–Nov.	M/W	Sofia, Bulgaria	
November 27–28	Swiss Championships	Nat.	Senior; Junior	All; D	Lucerne, Switzerland	
November 29–30	Serbian Championships	Nat.	Sen.–Nov.	W	Belgrade, Serbia	
Nov. 30 – Dec. 5	British Championships	Nat.	Sen.–Nov.	All	Sheffield, England, United Kingdom	
December 1–5	Skate Canada Challenge	Other	Sen.–Jun.	All	Regina, Saskatchewan, Canada	
December 3–5	Danish Championships	Nat.	Sen.–Nov.	M/W	Frederikshavn, Denmark	
December 3–5	Estonian Championships	Nat.	Senior	M/W/D	Tallinn, Estonia	
December 3–5	Lithuanian Championships	Nat.	Sen.–Nov.	M/W	Kaunas, Lithuania	
December 4–5	Italian Championships	Nat.	Senior; Junior	All; D	Turin, Italy	
December 7–8	Ukrainian Championships	Nat.	Senior	All	Kyiv, Ukraine	
December 9–11	Austrian Championships	Nat.	Senior; Jun.–Nov.	M/W/P; All	Graz, Austria	
December 9–11	German Championships	Nat.	Senior; Jun.–Nov.	All; P/D	Neuss, Germany	
December 11–12	Romanian Championships	Nat.	Sen.–Jun.	M/W	Miercurea Ciuc, Romania	
December 15–16	Israeli Championships	Nat.	Sen.–Nov.	All	Holon, Israel	
December 16–19	Four Nationals (Czech/Hungarian/Polish/Slovak)	Nat.	Senior; Junior	All; P/D	Spišská Nová Ves, Slovakia	
December 16–19	French Championships	Nat.	Senior	All	Cergy-Pontoise, France	
December 17–19	Finnish Championships	Nat.	Senior	All	Pori, Finland	
December 17–19	Spanish Championships	Nat.	Sen.–Nov.	All	Jaca, Spain	
December 18–19	Slovenian Championships	Nat.	Sen.-Nov.	M/W	Celje, Slovenia	
December 21–26	Russian Championships	Nat.	Senior	All	Saint Petersburg, Russia	
December 22–26	Japan Championships	Nat.	Senior	All	Saitama, Japan	
2022
January 3–9	U.S. Championships	Nat.	Sen.–Jun.	All	Nashville, Tennessee, United States	
January 6–13	Canadian Championships	Nat.	Sen.–Jun.	All	Ottawa, Ontario, Canada	
January 7–9	South Korean Championships	Nat.	Senior; Junior	M/W; M/W/D	Uijeongbu, South Korea	
January 18–22	Russian Junior Champ.	Nat.	Junior	All	Saransk, Russia	
January 22–23	Swiss Junior Champ.	Nat.	Jun.–Nov.	All	Bulle, Switzerland	
January 24–27	Ukrainian Junior Champ.	Nat.	Junior	All	Kyiv, Ukraine	
February 4–6	French Junior Champ.	Nat.	Junior	All	Charleville-Mézières, France	
February 5–6	Estonian Junior Champ.	Nat.	Jun.–Nov.	M/W/D	Tallinn, Estonia	
February 12–13	Italian Junior Champ.	Nat.	Junior	M/W/P	Turin, Italy	
February 23–27	Russian Cup Final	Other	Sen.–Jun.	All	Saransk, Russia	
February 24–27	Dutch Championships	Nat.	Senior; Jun.–Nov.	W/P/D; W	Tilburg, Netherlands (Note: Originally scheduled to be held in The Hague.)	
March 26–27	Singaporean Championships	Nat.	Sen.–Nov.	M/W	Jurong East, Singapore	
April 1–3	Norwegian Championships	Nat.	Senior Jun.–Nov.	W M/W	Oslo, Norway	
April 7–10	Swedish Championships	Nat.	Sen.–Nov.	M/W	Borlänge, Sweden; Falun, Sweden	
April 30-May 1	Greek Championships	Nat.	Sen.–Nov.	W M/W	Tavros, Greece	
May 9–10	South African Championships	Nat.	Sen.–Nov.	M/W	Cape Town, South Africa	
May 9–10	Bosnian Championships	Nat.	Jun.–Nov.	W	Zagreb, Croatia	
May 21–22	Irish Championships	Nat.	Senior Junior	M M/W/D	Dundee, Scotland	
June 21–22	Hong Kong Championships	Nat.	Sen.–Nov.	M/W	Kowloon Tong, Hong Kong	

=== Cancelled ===
Date	Event	Type	Level	Disc.	Location	Refs
2021
Nov. 27 – Dec. 3	Australian Championships	Nat.	Sen.–Nov.	All	Boondall, Australia	
Dec. 6 – Dec. 12	Chinese Championships	Nat.	Sen.–Jun.	All	Beijing, China	
2022

== Senior medalists ==
=== Senior men ===
Men
Nation	Gold	Silver	Bronze	Refs
Austria	Luc Maierhofer	Maurizio Zandron	Valentin Eisenbauer	
Bulgaria	Larry Loupolover	Radoslav Marinov	Alexander Zlatkov	
Canada	Keegan Messing	Roman Sadovsky	Wesley Chiu	
Chinese Taipei	Yeh Che-Yu	—N/a		
Czech Republic	Matyáš Bělohradský	Georgii Reshtenko	—N/a	
Denmark	Daniel Tsion	Nikolaj Mølgaard Pedersen	—N/a	
Estonia	Aleksandr Selevko	Arlet Levandi	Mihhail Selevko	
Finland	Valtter Virtanen	Makar Suntsev	Jan Ollikainen	
France	Kévin Aymoz	Adam Siao Him Fa	Luc Economides	
Germany	Paul Fentz	Kai Jagoda	Nikita Starostin	
(United Kingdom) Great Britain	Graham Newberry	Peter James Hallam	Elliott Thompson	
Hong Kong	Yuen Lap Kan	Adonis Wai Chung Wong	Kwun Hung Leung	
Hungary	András Csernoch	Aleksandr Vlasenko	Mózes József Berei	
(Republic of Ireland) Ireland	Samuel McAllister	Conor Stakelum	—N/a	
Israel	Mark Gorodnitsky	Alexei Bychenko	Daniel Samohin	
Italy	Daniel Grassl	Matteo Rizzo	Gabriele Frangipani	
Japan	Yuzuru Hanyu	Shoma Uno	Yuma Kagiyama	
Mexico	Donovan Carrillo	Diego Saldaña	Rodrigo Carranza	
Poland	Vladimir Samoilov	Kornel Witkowski	Miłosz Witkowski	
Russia	Mark Kondratiuk	Mikhail Kolyada	Andrei Mozalev	
Singapore	Pagiel Yie Ken Sng	—N/a		
Slovakia	Adam Hagara	Michael Neuman	—N/a	
South Africa	Evan Wrensch	—N/a		
Sweden	Nikolaj Majorov	Gabriel Folkesson	Johan Sparr	
South Korea	Cha Jun-hwan	Lee Si-hyeong	Kyeong Jae-seok	
Spain	Tomàs Llorenç Guarino Sabaté	Pablo García	Iker Oyarzabal Albas	
Switzerland	Lukas Britschgi	Egor Murashov	Nurullah Sahaka	
Turkey	Burak Demirboğa	Başar Oktar	—N/a	
Ukraine	Ivan Shmuratko	Glib Smotrov	Kyrylo Marsak	
United States	Nathan Chen	Ilia Malinin	Vincent Zhou	

=== Senior women ===
Women
Nation	Gold	Silver	Bronze	Refs
Austria	Stefanie Pesendorfer	Olga Mikutina	Sophia Schaller	
Belgium	Loena Hendrickx	Jade Hovine	—N/a	
Bulgaria	Kristina Grigorova	Ivelina Baycheva	Simona Gospodinova	
Canada	Madeline Schizas	Véronik Mallet	Gabrielle Daleman	
Chinese Taipei	Ting Tzu-Han	Joelle Peijen Lin	—N/a	
Czech Republic	Eliška Březinová	Nikola Rychtařiková	Ellen Slavíčková	
Denmark	Maia Sørensen	Amalie Borup	Felice Basbøll	
Estonia	Niina Petrõkina	Eva-Lotta Kiibus	Nataly Langerbaur	
Finland	Jenni Saarinen	Linnea Ceder	Emmi Peltonen	
France	Léa Serna	Lorine Schild	Lola Ghozali	
Germany	Nicole Schott	Kristina Isaev	Elisabeth Jäger	
Greece	Dimitra Korri	Elisavet Voulgari	—N/a	
(United Kingdom) Great Britain	Natasha McKay	Karly Robertson	Nina Povey	
Hong Kong	Joanna So	Hiu Yau Chow	Hoi Tik Rachel Yu	
Hungary	Júlia Láng	Regina Schermann	Bernadett Szigeti	
Iceland	Aldís Kara Bergsdóttir	—N/a		
Israel	Taylor Morris	—N/a		
Italy	Lara Naki Gutmann	Anna Pezzetta	Marina Piredda	
Japan	Kaori Sakamoto	Wakaba Higuchi	Mana Kawabe	
Lithuania	Aleksandra Golovkina	Selina Kaneda	Sharlote Jekabsone	
Mexico	Eugenia Garza	Andrea Montesinos Cantú	Ana Camila Gonzalez	
Netherlands	Lindsay van Zundert	Niki Wories	—N/a	
Norway	Frida Turiddotter Berge	Silja Anna Skulstad Urang	Thea Karlstad	
Poland	Ekaterina Kurakova	Elżbieta Gabryszak	Agnieszka Rejment	
Romania	Julia Sauter	Ana Sofia Beşchea	Ana Maria Ion	
Russia	Alexandra Trusova	Anna Shcherbakova	Adeliia Petrosian	
Serbia	Zona Apostolovic	—N/a		
Singapore	Ching Ting Su	Charlotte Lim	Xin Yi Loke	
Slovakia	Ema Doboszová	Alexandra Michaela Filcová	—N/a	
Slovenia	Daša Grm	Maria Daud	Alja Resman	
South Africa	Gian-Quen Isaacs	Kathryn Winstanley	Abigail Samuels	
Sweden	Josefin Taljegård	Isabelle Paulsson	Emma Kivioja	
South Korea	You Young	Kim Ye-lim	Lee Hae-in	
Spain	Marián Millares	Marie Kolly	Lucía Ruíz	
Switzerland	Alexia Paganini	Yasmine Kimiko Yamada	Livia Kaiser	
Turkey	Yasemin Zeki	Sinem Pekder	Özlem Dizmen	
Ukraine	Anastasiia Shabotova	Anastasia Gozhva	Anastasiia Arkhipova	
United States	Mariah Bell	Karen Chen	Isabeau Levito	

=== Senior pairs ===
Pairs
Nation	Gold	Silver	Bronze	Refs
Austria	Miriam Ziegler / Severin Kiefer	—N/a		
Canada	Kirsten Moore-Towers / Michael Marinaro	Evelyn Walsh / Trennt Michaud	Deanna Stellato-Dudek / Maxime Deschamps	
Finland	Milania Väänänen / Mikhail Akulov	—N/a		
France	Camille Kovalev / Pavel Kovalev	Coline Keriven / Noël-Antoine Pierre	—N/a	
Germany	Minerva Fabienne Hase / Nolan Seegert	Alisa Efimova / Ruben Blommaert	—N/a	
(United Kingdom) Great Britain	Anastasia Vaipan-Law / Luke Digby	Zoe Jones / Christopher Boyadji	Lydia Smart / Harry Mattick	
Hungary	Ioulia Chtchetinina / Márk Magyar	Mariia Pavlova / Balázs Nagy	—N/a	
Israel	Hailey Kops / Evgeni Krasnopolski	—N/a		
Italy	Nicole Della Monica / Matteo Guarise	Rebecca Ghilardi / Filippo Ambrosini	Sara Conti / Niccolò Macii	
Japan	Miyu Yunoki / Shoya Ichihashi	—N/a		
Netherlands	Daria Danilova / Michel Tsiba	Nika Osipova / Dmitry Epstein	—N/a	
Poland	Anna Hernik / Michał Woźniak	—N/a		
Russia	Anastasia Mishina / Aleksandr Galliamov	Aleksandra Boikova / Dmitrii Kozlovskii	Evgenia Tarasova / Vladimir Morozov	
Spain	Dorota Broda / Pedro Betegón Martín	—N/a		
Switzerland	Jessica Pfund / Joshua Santillan	—N/a		
Ukraine	Sofiia Holichenko / Artem Darenskyi	—N/a		
United States	Ashley Cain-Gribble / Timothy LeDuc	Jessica Calalang / Brian Johnson	Audrey Lu / Misha Mitrofanov	

=== Senior ice dance ===
Ice dance
Nation	Gold	Silver	Bronze	Refs
Canada	Piper Gilles / Paul Poirier	Laurence Fournier Beaudry / Nikolaj Sørensen	Marjorie Lajoie / Zachary Lagha	
Czech Republic	Natálie Taschlerová / Filip Taschler	—N/a		
Estonia	Solène Mazingue / Marko Jevgeni Gaidajenko	Aleksandra Samersova / Kevin Ojala	—N/a	
Finland	Juulia Turkkila / Matthias Versluis	Yuka Orihara / Juho Pirinen	—N/a	
France	Gabriella Papadakis / Guillaume Cizeron	Evgeniia Lopareva / Geoffrey Brissaud	Loïcia Demougeot / Théo Le Mercier	
Germany	Jennifer Janse van Rensburg / Benjamin Steffan	Katharina Müller / Tim Dieck	Lara Luft / Maximilian Pfisterer	
(United Kingdom) Great Britain	Lilah Fear / Lewis Gibson	Sasha Fear / George Waddell	Eleanor Hirst / Anthony Currie	
Hungary	Mariia Ignateva / Danijil Szemko	—N/a		
Israel	Mariia Nosovitskaya / Mikhail Nosovitskiy	Shira Ichilov / Volodymyr Byelikov	—N/a	
Italy	Charlène Guignard / Marco Fabbri	Carolina Moscheni / Francesco Fioretti	Elisabetta Leccardi / Mattia Dalla Torre	
Japan	Misato Komatsubara / Tim Koleto	Kana Muramoto / Daisuke Takahashi	Ayumi Takanami / Shingo Nishiyama	
Netherlands	Hanna Jakucs / Alessio Galli	—N/a		
Poland	Natalia Kaliszek / Maksym Spodyriev	Anastasia Polibina / Pavel Golovishnikov	Jenna Hertenstein / Damian Binkowski	
Russia	Alexandra Stepanova / Ivan Bukin	Diana Davis / Gleb Smolkin	Elizaveta Khudaiberdieva / Egor Bazin	
Slovakia	Mária Sofia Pucherová / Nikita Lysak	—N/a		
Spain	Olivia Smart / Adrián Díaz	Sara Hurtado / Kirill Khaliavin	—N/a	
Switzerland	Jasmine Tessari / Stéphane Walker	Fiona Pernas / German Shamraev	Arianna Sassi / Luca Morini	
Ukraine	Oleksandra Nazarova / Maxim Nikitin	Mariia Golubtsova / Kyrylo Belobrov	Anastasiia Sammel / Danylo Efremenko	
United States	Madison Chock / Evan Bates	Madison Hubbell / Zachary Donohue	Kaitlin Hawayek / Jean-Luc Baker	

== Junior medalists ==
=== Junior men ===
Junior men
Nation	Gold	Silver	Bronze	Refs
Austria	Tobia Oellerer	Alexander Charnagalov	Daniel Ruis	
Canada	Anthony Paradis	Grayson Long	John Kim	
Chinese Taipei	Li Yu-Hsiang	Zhou Guan-Ting	Huang Yu-Chun	
Estonia	Mihhail Selevko	Arlet Levandi	Jegor Martsenko	
Finland	Matias Lindfors	Yaroslav Krestyannikov	Arttu Juusola	
France	Corentin Spinar	François Pitot	Ian Vauclin	
(United Kingdom) Great Britain	Edward Appleby	Freddie Leggott	Ken Fitterer	
Greece	Aggelos Emmanouil	—N/a		
Hong Kong	Heung Lai Zhao	Chiu Hei Cheung	Jarvis Hu	
(Republic of Ireland) Ireland	Dillon Judge	—N/a		
Italy	Nikolaj Memola	Emanuele Indelicato	Aiden Lino Alexander Buttiero Khorev	
Japan	Kao Miura	Tatsuya Tsuboi	Nozomu Yoshioka	
Lithuania	Daniel Korabelnik	—N/a		
Norway	Francis Thor Kværnø Sutton	—N/a		
Russia	Ilya Yablokov	Nikolai Ugozhaev	Artem Kovalev	
South Africa	Nicolas van de Vijver	Cody Kock	—N/a	
South Korea	Seo Min-kyu	Park Hyun-seo	Kim Ye-sung	
Spain	Euken Alberdi	Christian Vaquero Toro	Daniel Rouco Morcillo	
Slovenia	David Sedej	—N/a		
Sweden	Casper Johansson	Jonathan Egyptson	Nels Ireholm	
Switzerland	Naoki Rossi	Georgii Pavlov	Aurel Chiper	
Turkey	Alp Eren Özkan	Ali Efe Güneş	Efe Ergin Dincer	
Ukraine	Kyrylo Marsak	Vadym Novikov	Glib Smotrov	
United States	Kai Kovar	Will Annis	Maxim Zharkov	

=== Junior women ===
Junior women
Nation	Gold	Silver	Bronze	Refs
Austria	Dorotea Leitgeib	Paola Jurisic	Jasmin Elsebaie	
Belgium	Nina Pinzarrone	Giulia Castorini	Maite van Mulders	
Bosnia and Herzegovina	Zara Husedzinovic	—N/a		
Canada	Justine Miclette	Fiona Bombardier	Michelle Deng	
Chinese Taipei	Ou Chia-Yu	Lin Yan-Yi	Audrey Lin	
Denmark	Catharina Victoria Petersen	Babeth Hansson-Östergaard	Anna-Flora Colmor Jepsen	
Estonia	Niina Petrõkina	Maria-Eliise Kaljuvere	Marianne Must	
Finland	Janna Jyrkinen	Petra Lahti	Iida Karhunen	
France	Lola Ghozali	Lorine Schild	Eva Dubecq	
(United Kingdom) Great Britain	Elena Komova	Christie Anne Shannon	Alana Pang	
Greece	Stella Makri	Whitney Ford	Melina Makri	
Hong Kong	Tsz Ching Chan	Chloe Desiree Leung	Akari Yamao	
Iceland	Júlía Rós Viðarsdóttir	Júlía Sylvía Gunnarsdóttir	Lena Rut Ásgeirsdóttir	
(Republic of Ireland) Ireland	Robyn Foster	Sophia Tkacheva	—N/a	
Israel	Mariia Seniuk	Elizabet Gervits	Ella Chen	
Italy	Amanda Ghezzo	Camilla Paola Gardini	Chiara Minighini	
Japan	Mao Shimada	Rion Sumiyoshi	Mone Chiba	
Lithuania	Daria Afinogenova	Meda Variakojytė	Anna Dea Gulbiani Schmidt	
Mexico	Andrea Astrain	Natalie Acosta	Fatima Gomez	
Netherlands	Dani Loonstra	Julia van Dijk	Isabella Smit	
Norway	Oda Tønnesen Havgar	Mia Risa Gomez	Ida Eline Vamnes	
Romania	Ana Sofia Beşchea	Luiza Ilie	Ruxandra Rotundu	
Russia	Sofia Akateva	Sofia Samodelkina	Sofia Muravieva	
Serbia	Darja Mijatovic	Danica Djordjevic	Ivona Kleut	
Singapore	McKayla Ong	Valarie Ang	—N/a	
Slovenia	Julia Lovrencic	Manca Ruddler	Ana Cmer	
South Africa	Ella Hawkes	Keva Emond	Zara-Lee Jones	
South Korea	Kwon Min-sol	Kim Yu-jae	Hwang Ji-young	
Spain	Júlia Rodríguez	Celia Vandhana Garnacho	Paula Maragrido Pereira	
Sweden	Josefin Brovall	Miranda Lundgren	Elinor Nordqvist	
Switzerland	Kimmy Repond	Sarina Joos	Ophélie Clerc	
Turkey	Ceren Karaş	Anna Deniz Özdemir	Fatma Yade Karlikli	
Ukraine	Kateryna Kononenko	Anastasiya Fomenchenkova	Anastasia Arkhipova	
United States	Clare Seo	Ava Ziegler	Josephine Lee	

=== Junior pairs ===
Junior pairs
Nation	Gold	Silver	Bronze	Refs
Canada	Brooke McIntosh / Benjamin Mimar	Summer Homick / Marty Haubrich	Emy Carignan / Bryan Pierro	
Czech Republic	Barbora Kucianová / Lukáš Vochozka	—N/a		
France	Oxana Vouillamoz / Flavien Giniaux	Louise Ehrhard / Matthis Pellegris	—N/a	
Germany	Letizia Roscher / Luis Schuster	—N/a		
(United Kingdom) Great Britain	Charlotte Hodgkinson / Elliot Appleby	Neamh Davison / Shailesh Caller	—N/a	
Italy	Alyssa Mountain / Filippo Clerici	—N/a		
Russia	Natalia Khabibullina / Ilya Knyazhuk	Iuliia Artemeva / Mikhail Nazarychev	Ekaterina Chikmareva / Matvei Ianchenkov	
Slovakia	Margaréta Mušková / Oliver Kubacak	—N/a		
Spain	Carolina Shan Campillo Álvarez / Miguel Martos	—N/a		
Ukraine	Violetta Sierova / Ivan Khobta	—N/a		
United States	Sonia Baram / Daniel Tioumentsev	Isabelle Martins / Ryan Bedard	Catherine Rivers / Timmy Chapman	

=== Junior ice dance ===
Junior ice dance
Nation	Gold	Silver	Bronze	Refs
Austria	Corinna Huber / Patrik Huber	Anita Straub / Andreas Straub	—N/a	
Canada	Natalie D'Alessandro / Bruce Waddell	Nadiia Bashynska / Peter Beaumont	Miku Makita / Tyler Gunara	
Czech Republic	Denisa Cimlová / Vilém Hlvasa	Kateřina Mrázková / Daniel Mrázek	Eliška Žáková / Filip Mencl	
Estonia	Tatjana Bunina / Ivan Kuznetsov	Isabella Sukhovskaya / Trevor Malkasaari	—N/a	
Finland	Daniela Ivanitskiy / David Goldshteyn	Emma Aalto / Lucas Tiilikainen	Hilda Taylor / Urho Reina	
France	Célina Fradji / Jean-Hans Fourneaux	Eva Bernard / Tom Jochum	Lilia-Maya Seclet Monchot / Martin Chardain	
Germany	Darya Grimm / Michail Savitskiy	Karla Karl / Kai Hoferichter	Janne Kummer / Erik Kummer	
(United Kingdom) Great Britain	Phebe Bekker / James Hernandez	Sophia Bushell / Alex Lapsky	Natalia Pallu Neves / Jayin Panesar	
Hungary	Reka Leveles / Balázs Leveles	Petra Zita Csikos / Patrik Csikos	—N/a	
Italy	Nicole Calderari / Marco Cilli	Noemi Tali / Stefano Frasca	Sofia Kirichenko / Alessandro Pellegrini	
Japan	Nao Kida / Masaya Morita	Ayano Sasaki / Atsuhiko Tamura	Kaho Yamashita / Yuto Nagata	
Russia	Irina Khavronina / Dario Cirisano	Vasilisa Kaganovskaia / Valeriy Angelopol	Sofya Tyutyunina / Alexander Shustitskiy	
Slovakia	Anna Simova / Kirill Aksenov	—N/a		
South Korea	Hannah Lim / Ye Quan	Kim Jin-ny / Lee Nam-u	—N/a	
Spain	Sofía Val / Nikita Vitryanyuk	Eloanne Ogor / Raúl Bermejo	—N/a	
Switzerland	Gina Zehnder / Beda Leon Sieber	Kayleigh Maksymec / Maximilien Rahier	Elina Bacsa / Cristian Murer	
Ukraine	Mariia Pinchuk / Mykyta Pogorelov	Miroslava Tkachenko / Andriy Kapran	Iryna Pidgaina / Artem Koval	
United States	Leah Neset / Artem Markelov	Angela Ling / Caleb Wein	Elliana Peal / Ethan Peal	
