= Ice skating in India =

- Country: India
- Governing body: Ice Skating Association of India
- National team: India

Ice skating is popular in North India in places like Ladakh, Kashmir and Shimla where cold weather occurs and it is possible to skate outdoors. Much of India has a tropical climate, hence in the rest of the country, ice skating is limited to the few artificial rinks available. An ice skating festival is organised in Shimla every year.

== Indoor ice rinks in India ==
Indoor ice skating rinks are present in the following places:

- Doon Ice Skating Rink 60m x 30m Olympic size has a seating capacity of 3000. Located at Maharana Pratap Sports Complex, Raipur, Dehradun.
- Essel World, Mumbai (Near Borivali).
- iSKATE located on 6th floor of Ambience Mall, Gurugram.
- Neptune Magnet Mall, Lower Powai, L.B.S. Marg, Bhandup (W), Mumbai.
- Atria the millennium mall, Dr Annie Besant Rd, Worli, Mumbai.[Not Present]
- Sparkys Ice Skating at Lulu international shopping mall, Edappally, Kochi.

== Outdoor ice rinks in India ==
- Shimla Ice Skating Rink, Circular Road, Shimla, Himachal Pradesh.
- Gulmarg under Ministry of Tourism, Jammu and Kashmir Government.
- Leh, Ladakh UT.
- Kargil, Ladakh UT.

== See also ==
- Bandy Federation of India
- Ice hockey in India
- List of Indian skaters
