= Maisy Ma =

Hong Kong figure skater

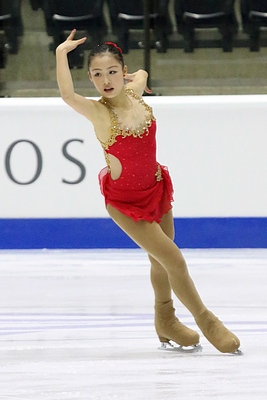
- Maisy Ma in 2015

Personal information
- Native name: 馬曉晴
- Born: November 18, 1999 (age 26) Hong Kong
- Height: 1.58 m (5 ft 2 in)

Figure skating career
- Country: Hong Kong
- Coach: Christine Krall, Damon Allen
- Skating club: Hong Kong Skating Union
- Began skating: 2005

Maisy Hiu Ching Ma (born November 18, 1999) is a Hong Kong figure skater. She has competed in the free skate at three ISU Championships.

== Career ==
Ma's family moved to Beijing with her family when she was three years old. Her nursery school was next to an ice rink. She was entranced by the skaters and started skating herself for fun.

Ma began skating in 2005. As a child, she was taught by Haijun Gao.

=== 2013–14 season ===
Ma began appearing on the junior international level in the 2013–14 season. After placing fifth at the Asian Trophy, she debuted on the ISU Junior Grand Prix (JGP) series, placing 6th in Gdańsk, Poland, in September 2013. She appeared at the 2014 World Junior Figure Skating Championships in Sofia, Bulgaria, but did not advance to the free skate. She trained under Tammy Gambill in Riverside, California until the end of the season.

=== 2014–15 season ===
In the 2014–15 season, Ma was coached by Rafael Arutyunyan and Nadia Kanaeva in California. She appeared at the 2014 World Junior Figure Skating Championships in Tallinn, Estonia, but did not advance to the freeskate.

=== 2015–16 season ===
In the 2015–16 season, Ma joined Christine Krall and Damon Allen in Colorado Springs, Colorado. Making her senior international debut, she finished 11th at the U.S. International Classic, a Challenger Series (CS) event in September 2015. In January 2016, she won the senior silver medal at the Reykjavík International Games. In February, she competed at her first senior ISU Championship at 2016 Four Continents in Taipei, Taiwan. At the 2016 World Junior Championships in Debrecen, Hungary, she qualified for the final segment by placing 11th in the short and went on to finish 15th overall.

=== 2016–17 season and after ===
At the beginning of the 2017–18 season, Ma planned to participate in the Asian Figure Skating Trophy, but had to withdraw due to a recurring ankle injury.

== Programs ==
Season	Short program	Free skating
2016–2017	Ambush from Ten Sides	Adagio in G minor by Remo Giazotto, Tomaso Albinoni choreo. by Cindy Stuart, Stephanee Grosscup
2015–2016	Historia de un Amor by Pérez Prado choreo. by Cindy Stuart	Adagio in G minor by Remo Giazotto, Tomaso Albinoni choreo. by Cindy Stuart, Stephanee Grosscup
2014–2015	Historia de un Amor by Pérez Prado choreo. by Cindy Stuart	O (Cirque du Soleil) by Benoît Jutras choreo. by Nadia Kanaeva
2013–2014	The Storm by Balázs Havasi choreo. by Justin Dillon	Dark Eyes choreo. by Justin Dillon

== Competitive highlights ==
CS: Challenger Series; JGP: Junior Grand Prix

International
Event	13–14	14–15	15–16	16–17
Four Continents			20th	18th
CS Autumn Classic				14th
CS U.S. Classic			11th	
Asian Games				10th
Reykjavík Int. Games			2nd	
International: Junior
Junior Worlds	36th	41st	15th	
JGP France				18th
JGP Japan		13th		
JGP Poland	6th		12th	
Asian Trophy	5th J	7th J	7th J	
Skate Helena		6th J		
National
Hong Kong Champ.			1st	1st
J = Junior level
