= Asian Open Figure Skating Trophy =

International figure skating competition

- Status: Active
- Genre: International competition
- Frequency: Annual
- Organiser: Asian Skating Union

The Asian Open Figure Skating Trophy (also known as the Asian Trophy; previously known as the Asian Figure Skating Championships) is an annual figure skating competition sanctioned by the International Skating Union (ISU), organized and hosted by the Asian Skating Union. Medals are awarded in men's singles, women's singles, pair skating, and ice dance at the senior and junior levels, although each discipline may not necessarily be held every year, and when the event is part of the Challenger Series, skaters earn points towards the World Standings and Season's World Ranking based on their results.

== Asian Open Figure Skating Classic ==
The Asian Open Figure Skating Classic was a figure skating competition planned to be inaugurated in October 2019 in Taipei, Taiwan. The competition was intended to be an ISU Challenger Series event, and would have awarded medals in men's singles, women's singles, and ice dance. On 22 July 2019, the International Skating Union revoked the Chinese Taipei Skating Union's right to hold the competition. The event was replaced with the Hong Kong Skating Union's Asian Open Figure Skating Trophy, originally scheduled to be held in August in Dongguan, China. The Sports Administration of the Republic of China ordered the removal of Chinese Taipei Skating Union Secretary-General Eddy Wu for mishandling the process. The Sports Administration also suspended funding of the Chinese Taipei Skating Union for one year.

== Senior medalists ==
CS: Challenger Series event

=== Men's singles ===
Senior men's event medalists
Year	Location	Gold	Silver	Bronze	Ref.
2007	(Taiwan) Taipei	(Chinese Taipei) Henry Lu Shih-hao	(Thailand) Romklao Sopa	(India) Anup Kumar Yama	
2008	Hong Kong	(North Korea) Ri Song-chol	(Kazakhstan) Abzal Rakimgaliev	(South Korea) Kim Min-seok	
2010	(Thailand) Bangkok	(Japan) Akio Sasaki	(Chinese Taipei) Tien Hung-wen	(Thailand) Karn Luanpreda	
2011	(China) Dongguan	(China) Yan Han	(Uzbekistan) Misha Ge	(China) Guan Yuhang	
2012	(Taiwan) Taipei	(Hong Kong) Chiu Ting Ronald Lam	(South Korea) Kim Min-seok	(South Korea) Lee June-hyoung	
2013	(Thailand) Bangkok	(Japan) Tatsuki Machida	(Uzbekistan) Misha Ge	(South Korea) Lee June-hyoung	
2014	(Taiwan) Taipei	(Japan) Shoma Uno	(South Korea) Kim Jin-seo	(South Korea) Lee June-hyoung	
2015	(Thailand) Bangkok	(Philippines) Michael Christian Martinez	(Japan) Keiji Tanaka	(Japan) Hiroaki Sato	
2016	(Philippines) Pasay	(Japan) Keiji Tanaka	(South Korea) Kim Jin-seo	(Malaysia) Julian Zhi Jie Yee	
2017	Hong Kong	(Japan) Keiji Tanaka	(Japan) Ryuju Hino	(South Korea) An Geon-hyeong	
2018 CS	(Thailand) Bangkok	(Japan) Sota Yamamoto	(Chinese Taipei) Tsao Chih-i	(South Korea) Byun Se-jong	
2019 CS	(China) Dongguan	(Italy) Daniel Grassl	(United States) Andrew Torgashev	(United States) Ryan Dunk	
2021	(China) Beijing	(Japan) Yuma Kagiyama	(Japan) Shun Sato	(China) Jin Boyang	
2022	(Indonesia) Jakarta	(China) Chen Yudong	(Hong Kong) Yuen Lap Kan	(New Zealand) Douglas Gerber	
2023	(Thailand) Bangkok	(China) Dai Daiwei	(South Korea) Cha Young-hyun	(Australia) Darian Kaptich	
2024	Hong Kong	(South Korea) Lee Si-hyeong	(China) Dai Daiwei	(Japan) Nozomu Yoshioka	
2025	(Philippines) Pasay	(South Korea) Kim Hyun-gyeom	(Chinese Taipei) Li Yu-Hsiang	(North Korea) Han Kwang Bom	
2026	(Indonesia) Jakarta	(Japan) Kazuki Tomono	(China) Boren Lu	(Chinese Taipei) Li Yu-Hsiang	

=== Women's singles ===
Senior women's event medalists
Year	Location	Gold	Silver	Bronze	Ref.
2007	(Taiwan) Taipei	(South Korea) Kim Soo-jin	(South Korea) Kim Na-young	(Hong Kong) Tamami Ono	
2008	Hong Kong	(Uzbekistan) Anastasia Gimazetdinova	(South Korea) Kim Na-young	(South Korea) Sin Na-hee	
2010	(Thailand) Bangkok	(Japan) Ayane Nakamura	(Thailand) Sandra Khopon	(South Korea) Kim Ji-young	
2011	(China) Dongguan	(South Korea) Park Yeon-jun	(China) Wang Jialei	(South Korea) Kwak Min-jeong	
2012	(Taiwan) Taipei	(South Korea) Park So-youn	(South Korea) Cho Kyung-ah	(South Korea) Lee Tae-yeon	
2013	(Thailand) Bangkok	(Japan) Satoko Miyahara	(China) Zhang Kexin	(Philippines) Melissa Bulanhagui	
2014	(Taiwan) Taipei	(Japan) Rika Hongo	(Japan) Riona Kato	(South Korea) Park So-youn	
2015	(Thailand) Bangkok	(Japan) Mai Mihara	(Japan) Riona Kato	(Japan) Kaori Sakamoto	
2016	(Philippines) Pasay	(Japan) Yura Matsuda	(South Korea) Choi Da-bin	(Chinese Taipei) Amy Lin	
2017	Hong Kong	(Japan) Kaori Sakamoto	(Japan) Yuna Shiraiwa	(Australia) Kailani Craine	
2018 CS	(Thailand) Bangkok	(South Korea) Lim Eun-soo	(Japan) Yuna Shiraiwa	(Japan) Mako Yamashita	
2019 CS	(China) Dongguan	(South Korea) Lim Eun-soo	(South Korea) Kim Ha-nul	(United States) Gabriella Izzo	
2021	(China) Beijing	(Japan) Mai Mihara	(Japan) Kaori Sakamoto	(Hong Kong) Joanna So	
2022	(Indonesia) Jakarta	(Philippines) Sofia Frank	(Hong Kong) Joanna So	(Chinese Taipei) Ting Tzu-Han	
2023	(Thailand) Bangkok	(China) An Xiangyi	(Chinese Taipei) Ting Tzu-Han	(China) Cheng Jiaying	
2024	Hong Kong	(China) An Xiangyi	(Japan) Mako Yamashita	(Japan) Mai Mihara	
2025	(Philippines) Pasay	(China) Zhang Ruiyang	(China) Zhu Yi	(China) Xu Wandi	
2026	(Indonesia) Jakarta	(Japan) Rinka Watanabe	(Chinese Taipei) Tsai Yu-Feng	(Australia) Sienna Kaczmarczyk	

=== Pairs ===
Senior pairs' event medalists
Year	Location	Gold	Silver	Bronze	Ref.
2007	(Taiwan) Taipei	No pairs competition			
2008	Hong Kong	(North Korea); Sung Mi-hyang; Jong Yong-hyok	(Hong Kong); Rie Aoi; Wen Xiong Guo	(North Korea); Ri Ji-hyang; Thae Won-hyok	
2016	(Philippines) Pasay	(North Korea); Ryom Tae-ok; Kim Ju-sik	(North Korea); Pak So-hyang; Song Nam-i	(Japan); Miu Suzaki; Ryuichi Kihara	
2017	Hong Kong	(South Korea); Kim Su-yeon; Kim Hyung-tae	(Japan); Miu Suzaki; Ryuichi Kihara	(Japan); Narumi Takahashi; Ryo Shibata	
2018	(Thailand) Bangkok	(China); Peng Cheng; Jin Yang	(North Korea); Ryom Tae-ok; Kim Ju-sik	No other competitors	
2021	(China) Beijing	(China); Sui Wenjing; Han Cong	(China); Peng Cheng; Jin Yang	(China); Wang Yuchen; Huang Yihang	
2025	(Philippines) Pasay	(China); Zhang Jiaxuan; Huang Yihang	(North Korea); Ryom Tae-ok; Han Kum-chol	(Philippines); Isabella Gamez; Aleksandr Korovin	

=== Ice dance ===
Senior ice dance event medalists
Year	Location	Gold	Silver	Bronze	Ref.
2007	(Taiwan) Taipei	No ice dance competition			
2018 CS	(Thailand) Bangkok	(China); Wang Shiyue; Liu Xinyu	(United States); Rachel Parsons; Michael Parsons	(Japan); Misato Komatsubara; Tim Koleto	
2019 CS	(China) Dongguan	(United States); Christina Carreira; Anthony Ponomarenko	(Russia); Ksenia Konkina; Pavel Drozd	(Georgia (country)); Maria Kazakova; Georgy Reviya	
2021	(China) Beijing	(China); Wang Shiyue; Liu Xinyu	(China); Chen Hong; Sun Zhuoming	No other competitors	

== Junior medalists ==
=== Men's singles ===
Junior men's event medalists
Year	Location	Gold	Silver	Bronze	Ref.
2007	(Taiwan) Taipei	(Japan) Naoto Saito	(Japan) Yukihiro Yoshida	(Hong Kong) Dennis Hon Lan To	
2008	Hong Kong	(Japan) Keiji Tanaka	(China) Luo Yuyanlong	(North Korea) Jang Ju-hyok	
2010	(Thailand) Bangkok	(Japan) Kosuke Nozue	(Chinese Taipei) Chen Jui-shu	(India) Dinesh Kumar	
2011	(China) Dongguan	(China) Jin Boyang	(South Korea) Lee June-hyoung	(South Korea) Lee Dong-won	
2012	(Taiwan) Taipei	(Chinese Taipei) Tsao Chih-i	(Japan) Taichi Honda	(Chinese Taipei) Jordan Ju	
2013	(Thailand) Bangkok	(South Korea) Alex Kang-chan Kam	(Chinese Taipei) Tsao Chih-i	(South Korea) Byun Se-jong	
2014	(Taiwan) Taipei	(Japan) Hidetsugu Kamata	(Malaysia) Julian Zhi Jie Yee	(Japan) Taichi Honda	
2015	(Thailand) Bangkok	(Japan) Mitsuki Sumoto	(Malaysia) Kai Xiang Chew	(North Korea) Han Kum-chol	
2016	(Philippines) Pasay	(Japan) Koshiro Shimada	(South Korea) Park Sung-hoon	(North Korea) Han Kum-chol	
2017	Hong Kong	(Japan) Sena Miyake	(South Korea) Park Sung-hoon	(South Korea) Kyeong Jae-Seok	
2018	(Thailand) Bangkok	(Japan) Yuma Kagiyama	(Japan) Tatsuya Tsuboi	(United States) Nicholas Hsieh	
2019	(China) Dongguan	(China) Chen Yudong	(Chinese Taipei) Lin Fang-Yi	(South Korea) Lee Dong-hyeok	
2022	(Indonesia) Jakarta	(China) Chen Yudong	(Chinese Taipei) Li Yu-Hsiang	(Singapore) Pagiel Yie Ken Sng	
2023	(Thailand) Bangkok	(Chinese Taipei) Li Yu-Hsiang	(New Zealand) Li Yanhao	(Hong Kong) Jarvis Ho	
2024	Hong Kong	(Hong Kong) Li Jiarui	(Hong Kong) Jarvis Ho	(China) Sun Yihe	
2025	(Philippines) Pasay	(Thailand) Hiro Kaewtathip	(Hong Kong) Jarvis Ho	(Hong Kong) Li Jiarui	
2026	(Indonesia) Jakarta	(Thailand) Hiro Kaewtathip	(South Korea) Aaron Kim	(Hong Kong) Li Jiarui	

=== Women's singles ===
Junior women's event medalists
Year	Location	Gold	Silver	Bronze	Ref.
2007	(Taiwan) Taipei	(Japan) Yuki Nishino	(Japan) Ayane Nakamura	(Chinese Taipei) Sigrid Young	
2008	Hong Kong	(Japan) Yuki Nishino	(South Korea) Kwak Min-jeong	(South Korea) Yun Yea-ji	
2010	(Thailand) Bangkok	(Japan) Kako Tomotaki	(Thailand) Mimi Tanasorn Chindasook	(Thailand) Suthatta Yilansuwan	
2011	(China) Dongguan	(South Korea) Kim Hae-jin	(South Korea) Park So-youn	(Japan) Hinano Isobe	
2012	(Taiwan) Taipei	(Japan) Satoko Miyahara	(South Korea) Choi Hwi	(Japan) Yuka Nagai	
2013	(Thailand) Bangkok	(Japan) Kaori Sakamoto	(Japan) Mai Mihara	(South Korea) Choi Da-bin	
2014	(Taiwan) Taipei	(Japan) Wakaba Higuchi	(South Korea) Choi Da-bin	(Japan) Rin Nitaya	
2015	(Thailand) Bangkok	(Japan) Yuna Aoki	(Japan) Marin Honda	(South Korea) Kim Se-na	
2016	(Philippines) Pasay	(Japan) Marin Honda	(South Korea) Kim Ye-lim	(South Korea) Lim Eun-soo	
2017	Hong Kong	(Japan) Rika Kihira	(South Korea) Lim Eun-soo	(South Korea) Kim Ye-lim	
2018	(Thailand) Bangkok	(South Korea) Lee Hae-in	(United States) Gabriella Izzo	(South Korea) Wi Seo-yeong	
2019	(China) Dongguan	(South Korea) Wi Seo-yeong	(South Korea) Ji Seo-yeon	(Hong Kong) Chow Hiu Yau	
2022	(Indonesia) Jakarta	(South Korea) Hwang Ji-hyun	(Thailand) Phattaratida Kaneshige	(Hong Kong) Chan Tsz Ching	
2023	(Thailand) Bangkok	(Chinese Taipei) Tsai Yu-Feng	(South Korea) Lee Hyo-rin	(Thailand) Phattaratida Kaneshige	
2024	Hong Kong	(China) Xu Wandi	(Hong Kong) Ariel Guo	(South Korea) Kim Geon-hee	
2025	(Philippines) Pasay	(South Korea) Youn Seo-jin	(Hong Kong) Ariel Guo	(China) Tong Ruichen	
2026	(Indonesia) Jakarta	(Australia) Mia Zixuan Zeng	(United States) Angela Shao	(Hong Kong) Ariel Guo	

== See also ==
- Asian Distance Speed Skating Championships
- Asian Speed Skating Championships
- Shanghai Trophy
