= Tara Prasad =

American-Indian figure skater (born 2000)

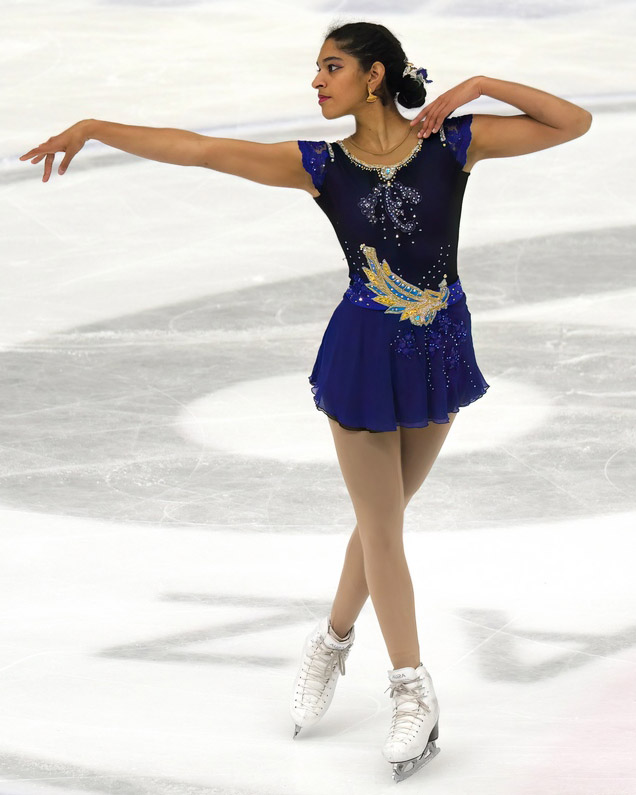
- Prasad at the 2021 Cup of Austria

Personal information
- Born: 24 February 2000 (age 26) Cedar Rapids, Iowa, United States
- Home town: Chennai, India; Colorado Springs, United States
- Height: 1.70 m (5 ft 7 in)

Figure skating career
- Country: India (since 2020); United States (until 2016)
- Discipline: Women's singles
- Coach: Stephanie Kuban; Tom Zakrajsek; Ryan Jahnke; Rebecca Bradley; Laureano Ibarra
- Skating club: Ice Skating Association of Tamil Nadu
- Began skating: 2007

Medal record
Representing India
Indian Championships
Gold medal – first place	2025 Gurugram	Singles
Gold medal – first place	2023 Gurugram	Singles
Gold medal – first place	2022 Gurugram	Singles

Tara Prasad (born 24 February 2000) is an American-born Indian figure skater who competes in women's singles skating. She is the 2024 Reykjavik International silver medalist, the 2024 Skate Celje silver medalist and 2025 bronze medalist, the 2025 Bosphorus Cup silver medalist, and a four-time Indian national champion (2022–23, 2025, 2026).

She competed within the U.S. in the regionals before representing India internationally. She has competed in the final segments of the 2022, 2023 and 2025 Four Continents Figure Skating Championships.

== Personal life ==
Prasad was born on 24 February 2000 in Cedar Rapids, Iowa, to Indian immigrants from Tamil Nadu. Her mother, Kavitha Ramasamy, was a national champion in hurdling for India in her teens. Except for her father Sai Prasad, who lives with her in the United States, Prasad's family lives in Chennai, India. Prasad splits her time between the two countries and has held Indian citizenship since 2019. She speaks Tamil and English.

During a 5-year break from skating, Prasad had originally planned to move back to India permanently with her family to live and study. She switched from an Overseas Citizenship of India (OCI) card to an Indian passport, intending to settle in Chennai. However, after attending a skating camp in India, she decided to return to skating, this time under the Indian flag. Prasad states that one of her reasons for continuing skating is to “realize her full potential.”

Prasad's figure skating inspirations include 2010 Olympic champion Kim Yu-na, 2018 Olympic champion Aljona Savchenko, 2015 World champion Elizaveta Tuktamysheva, and fellow Indian-American skater Ami Parekh.

She enjoys hiking, rock climbing, art, choreography and driving cars.

== Career ==
=== Early career ===
Prasad began learning how to skate at age seven in Cleveland, Ohio. She competed within the United States as a child at the juvenile through the novice levels until 2016. Prasad described her early career as “recreational” and quit competing at the age of 16. However, she returned to skating some years later, having rediscovered her motivation to learn new skills on the ice.

=== 2019–2020 season ===
She made her senior international debut for India in 2020 at the Mentor Toruń Cup.

=== 2021-2022 season ===
She competed at the 2022 Four Continents Championships, where she finished 20th.

=== 2022–2023 season ===
Tara had a delayed beginning to her 2022—2023 season, as she suffered two ankle sprains and a back injury, which prevented her from training for four months. However, she was able to compete at the 2023 Four Continents Championships, where she finished in fourteenth place.

=== 2023–2024 season ===
In January 2024, Prasad placed first in the short program and third in the free skate segments of the 2024 Reykjavik International Games and received the silver medal, thereby becoming India's first medalist in a senior international figure skating competition. She withdrew from the 2024 Four Continents Championships due to health problems caused by low blood pressure.

=== 2024–2025 season ===
After winning her third national title at the 2025 Indian Championships, Prasad went on to finish sixteenth at the 2025 Four Continents Championships.

=== 2025–2026 season ===
Prasad opened the season by finishing fifth at the 2025 Asian Open Trophy. In late January, she competed at the 2026 Four Continents Championships – finishing in eighteenth place overall.

== Programs ==
Season	Short program	Free skating	Exhibition
2025–2026	Dirty Paws by Of Monsters and Men choreo. by Tara Prasad	The Night We Met; Love Like Ghosts; Meet Me in the Woods by Lord Huron choreo. by Tara Prasad	
2024–2025	Poeta en el viento by Vicente Amigo choreo. by Tara Prasad; Smiles For Y by Ezio Bosso; Etudes, No. 6 by Víkingur Ólafsson and Philip Glass choreo. by Tara Prasad	The Night We Met; Love Like Ghosts; Meet Me in the Woods by Lord Huron choreo. by Tara Prasad	
2023–2024	Alegría by Cirque du Soleil choreo. by Tara Prasad	Padmaavat by Hasit Nanda; Padmaavat by Sanjay Leela Bhansali choreo. by Tara Prasad	
2022–2023	Rhapsody on a Theme of Paganini by Sergei Rachmaninoff choreo. by Tara Prasad	Padmaavat by Hasit Nanda; Padmaavat by Sanjay Leela Bhansali choreo. by Tara Prasad	Adheeraa (from Cobra) by A. R. Rahman choreo. by Tara Prasad
2021–2022	Danse macabre by Camille Saint-Saëns performed by Angèle Dubeau and La Pietà choreo. by Tara Prasad	La Bayadère by Ludwig Minkus performed by Evergreen Symphony Orchestra choreo. by Tara Prasad	

== Competitive highlights ==
- CS – Event of the ISU Challenger Series
- TBD – Assigned
- WD – Withdrew from competition

Competition placements at senior level
Season	2019–20	2021–22	2022–23	2023–24	2024–25	2025–26	2026–27
Four Continents Championships		20th	14th		16th	18th	
Indian Championships		1st	1st		1st		1st
CS Cup of Austria		29th					
CS Finlandia Trophy			22nd				
CS Nebelhorn Trophy		30th					
CS Tallinn Trophy				7th			
CS Trophée Métropole Nice					22nd		
CS Warsaw Cup				WD			
Asian Open Trophy						5th	
Asian Winter Games					8th		
Bavarian Open			6th				
Bellu Memorial		WD					
Bosphorus Cup						2nd	
Cranberry Cup		18th	9th	12th			
Dragon Trophy		5th					
Mentor Toruń Cup	WD						
Merano Ice Trophy		4th					
Philadelphia			7th				
Reykjavik Games				2nd			
Silver Skate Cup						2nd	
Skate Celje					2nd	3rd	
Sofia Trophy					9th		
Tallink Hotels Cup						WD	
U.S. Classic		8th					
Volvo Open Cup					4th		

== Detailed results ==
ISU personal best scores in the +5/-5 GOE System
Segment	Type	Score	Event
Total	TSS	143.01	2025 Four Continents Championships
Short program	TSS	47.39	2025 Four Continents Championships
Short program	TES	25.31	2025 Four Continents Championships
Short program	PCS	22.92	2021 CS Cup of Austria
Free skating	TSS	95.62	2025 Four Continents Championships
Free skating	TES	52.42	2025 Four Continents Championships
Free skating	PCS	45.40	2023 Four Continents Championships

=== Senior level ===
Results in the 2019–20 season
Date	Event	SP		FS		Total	
Date	Event	P	Score	P	Score	P	Score
Jan 7–12, 2020	(Poland) 2020 Mentor Toruń Cup	16	28.27	–	–	–	WD

Results in the 2021–22 season
Date	Event	SP		FS		Total	
Date	Event	P	Score	P	Score	P	Score
Aug 11–15, 2021	(United States) 2021 Cranberry Cup International	14	46.47	19	77.64	18	124.11
Sep 15–18, 2021	(United States) 2021 U.S. Figure Skating Classic	9	44.66	8	84.53	8	129.19
Sep 21–25, 2021	(Germany) 2021 CS Nebelhorn Trophy	34	37.51	24	84.76	30	122.27
Nov 11–14, 2021	2021 CS Cup of Austria	26	44.44	30	66.14	29	110.58
Jan 17–22, 2022	(Estonia) 2022 Four Continents Championships	20	43.31	19	84.62	20	127.93
Feb 4–6, 2022	(Italy) 2022 Merano Cup	14	50.08	4	84.31	4	134.39
Feb 10–13, 2022	(Slovenia) 2022 Dragon Trophy	6	52.54	2	103.42	5	155.66
Feb 24–27, 2022	(Belgium) 2022 Bellu Memorial	9	45.86	–	–	–	WD

Results in the 2022–23 season
Date	Event	SP		FS		Total	
Date	Event	P	Score	P	Score	P	Score
Aug 3–7, 2022	(United States) 2022 Philadelphia Summer International	7	45.60	6	80.94	7	126.54
Aug 10–14, 2022	(Germany) 2022 Cranberry Cup International	10	46.12	8	87.43	9	133.35
Oct 5–9, 2022	(Finland) 2022 CS Finlandia Trophy	19	44.26	22	78.49	22	122.75
Jan 31–Feb 5, 2023	(United States) 2023 Bavarian Open	6	47.20	6	85.70	6	132.90
Feb 7–12, 2023	(United States) 2023 Four Continents Championships	14	46.04	14	87.11	14	133.15

Results in the 2023–24 season
Date	Event	SP		FS		Total	
Date	Event	P	Score	P	Score	P	Score
Aug 10–14, 2023	(United States) 2023 Cranberry Cup International	15	43.11	11	84.17	12	127.28
Nov 16–19, 2023	(Poland) 2024 CS Warsaw Cup	27	42.31	–	–	–	WD
Nov 21–24, 2023	(Estonia) 2023 Tallinn Trophy	8	48.24	6	88.34	7	136.58
Jan 26–28, 2024	(Iceland) 2024 Reykjavik International Games	1	45.98	3	77.92	2	123.90

Results in the 2024–25 season
Date	Event	SP		FS		Total	
Date	Event	P	Score	P	Score	P	Score
Oct 16–20, 2024	(France) 2024 CS Trophée Métropole Nice Côte d'Azur	19	42.74	22	74.70	22	117.44
Nov 14–17, 2024	(Slovakia) 2024 Skate Celje	1	52.76	4	92.48	2	145.24
Jan 7–12, 2025	(Bulgaria) 2025 Sofia Trophy	12	48.55	9	93.64	9	142.19
Jan 16–19, 2025	(Latvia) 2025 Volvo Open Cup	4	47.58	4	95.15	4	142.73
Feb 11–13, 2025	(China) 2025 Asian Winter Games	8	49.17	7	99.17	8	148.34
Feb 19–23, 2025	(South Korea) 2025 Four Continents Championships	17	47.39	16	95.62	16	143.01

Results in the 2025–26 season
Date	Event	SP		FS		Total	
Date	Event	P	Score	P	Score	P	Score
Aug 1–5, 2025	(Philippines) 2025 Asian Open Trophy	6	42.27	5	89.60	5	131.87
Nov 15-16, 2025	(Slovakia) 2025 Skate Celje	4	47.24	3	89.26	3	136.68
Nov 24-30, 2025	(Turkey) 2025 Bosphorus Cup	5	51.69	2	98.03	2	149.72
Jan 21-25, 2026	(China) 2026 Four Continents Championships	20	44.23	17	90.43	18	134.66
Jan 29 - Feb 1, 2026	(Latvia) 2026 Silver Skate Winter Cup	3	48.48	1	105.63	2	154.11
Feb 19-22, 2026	(Estonia) 2026 Tallink Hotels Cup	16	43.06	—N/a	—N/a	WD	—N/a
