= Hong Kong Figure Skating Championships =

Recurring figure skating competition

- Status: Active
- Genre: National championships
- Frequency: Annual
- Venue: Festival Walk
- Location: Hong Kong
- Country: Hong Kong
- Inaugurated: 1980
- Organiser: Hong Kong China Skating Union

The Hong Kong Figure Skating Championships (Chinese: 香港花樣滑冰錦標賽) are held annually to crown the national champions of Hong Kong. Skaters compete in men's singles, women's singles, pair skating, and ice dance at the senior, junior, and novice levels, although not every discipline is held every year due to a lack of participants. The event is organized by the Hong Kong China Skating Union (Chinese: 中國香港滑冰聯盟), the sport's national governing body, and held in the ice rink at Festival Walk.

== Senior medalists ==
=== Men's singles ===
Year	Gold	Silver	Bronze	Ref.
2003	Edward Ka-yin Chow	Tatsuya Tanaka	No other competitors	
2004	Misha Ge	Edward Ka-yin Chow	Tatsuya Tanaka	
2005	Edward Ka-yin Chow	Tatsuya Tanaka	No other competitors	
2006	Edward Ka-yin Chow	Tatsuya Tanaka	No other competitors	
2007	Tatsuya Tanaka			
2008–2009	No men's competitors			
2010	Vincent Ip	To Hon Lam	No other competitors	
2011	To Hon Lam	Leung Kwun Hung	Matthew Tsang Cheuk Yin	
2012	Ronald Lam	To Hon Lam	Leung Kwun Hung	
2013	Leung Kwun Hung	To Hon Lam	No other competitors	
2014	Ronald Lam	Harry Hau Yin Lee	Leung Kwun Hung	
2015	Ronald Lam	Leslie Man Cheuk Ip	Harry Hau Yin Lee	
2016	Leslie Man Cheuk Ip	Harry Hau Yin Lee	Leung Kwun Hung	
2017	Leslie Man Cheuk Ip	Harrison Wong Jon-Yen	Harry Hau Yin Lee	
2018	Harrison Wong Jon-Yen	Adonis Wong Wai Chung	Leslie Ip Man Cheuk	
2019	Harrison Wong Jon-Yen	Lincoln Yuen Lap Kan	Leung Kwun Hung	
2020	No competition held due to the COVID-19 pandemic			
2021	Lincoln Yuen Lap Kan	Harrison Wong Jon-Yen	Leung Kwun Hung	
2022	Lincoln Yuen Lap Kan	Adonis Wong Wai Chung	Leung Kwun Hung	
2023	Lincoln Yuen Lap Kan	Leung Kwun Hung	Adonis Wong Wai Chung	
2024	Jarvis Ho	Lincoln Yuen Lap Kan	Zhao Heung Lai	
2025	Jarvis Ho	Lincoln Yuen Lap Kan	Chiu Hei Cheung	

=== Women's singles ===
Year	Gold	Silver	Bronze	Ref.
2003	Christine Lee	Tan Tan Yip	No other competitors	
2004	Tamami Ono	No other competitors		
2005	Tamami Ono	Karen Ka Man Leung	Pui Lam Yuen	
2006	Tamami Ono	Karen Ka Man Leung	Rie Aoi	
2007	Ho Mei Lai			
2008	Tamami Ono	Hilary Ho	Kristine Lee	
2009	Tamami Ono	Tiffany Yu	Wang Haitong	
2010	Tamami Ono	Tiffany Yu	Lee Tze Ching	
2011	Tiffany Yu	Lee Tze Ching	Shirley Angel Chan	
2012	Tiffany Yu	Sumika Yamada	No other competitors	
2013	Tiffany Yu	Sumika Yamada	Tiffany Lau Yong Yeu	
2014	Chelsea Chiyan Yim	Tiffany Lau Yong Yeu	No other competitors	
2015	Marin Ono	Tiffany Chitring Yim	Tiffany Lau Yong Yeu	
2016	Maisy Ma	Jaden Ka-hay Cheng	Priscilla June Chau	
2017	Maisy Ma	Chow Hiu Lok	Chik Tsz Ying	
2018	Kwong Hiu Ching	Joanna So	Cherry Lee Yat Long	
2019	Yi Christy Leung	Kwong Hiu Ching	No other competitors	
2020	No competition held due to the COVID-19 pandemic			
2021	Joanna So	Kahlen Cheung Cheuk Ka	Chow Hiu Yau	
2022	Joanna So	Chow Hiu Yau	Rachel Yu Hoi Tik	
2023	Joanna So	Rachel Yu Hoi Tik	Janice Chan Sin Ying	
2024	Chan Tsz Ching	Joanna So	Chow Hiu Yau	
2025	Chan Tsz Ching	Joanna So	Megan Wong	
2026	Ariel Guo	Tiffany Lau Yong Yeu	Yun Xue	

=== Pairs ===
Year	Gold	Silver	Bronze	Ref.
2014	Marin Ono; To Hon Lam	No other competitors		
2015–2023	No pair's competitors			
2024	Kristal Chow; Wong Yiu Hong	No other competitors		
2025	No pairs competitors			

=== Ice dance ===
Year	Gold	Silver	Bronze	Ref.
2005	Tan Tan Yip; Bin Suo	No other competitors		
2006	Tan Tan Yip; Bin Suo	No other competitors		
2007–2023	No ice dance competitors			
2024	Kang Ran; Chau Han Wan	No other competitors		
2025	No ice dance competitors			

== Junior medalists ==
=== Men's singles ===
Year	Gold	Silver	Bronze	Ref.
2008	To Hon-Lam	Lai Yat-Hin	No other competitors	
2009	Lee Hau Yin	Vincent Ip	Lincoln Yuen Lap Kan	
2010	Lee Hau Yin	Lincoln Yuen Lap Kan	Matthew Leung Kwun Hung	
2011	Harry Hau Yin Lee	Wayne Chung Wing Yin	Lincoln Yuen Lap Kan	
2012	Harry Hau Yin Lee	Wayne Chung Wing Yin	Lincoln Yuen Lap Kan	
2013	Leslie Ip Man Cheuk	Lincoln Yuen Lap Kan	Wayne Chung Wing Yin	
2014	Wayne Chung Wing Yin	No other competitors		
2015	Wayne Chung Wing Yin	No other competitors		
2016	Harrison Wong Jon-yen	No other competitors		
2017	Naoki Ma	No other competitors		
2018	Jarke Zhao Heung Lai	Naoki Ma	Leung Ho Yu	
2019	Jarke Zhao Heung Lai	Leung Ho Yu	No other competitors	
2020	No competition held due to the COVID-19 pandemic			
2021	Cheung Chiu Hei	Jarke Zhao Heung Lai	Chow Chit Wang	
2022	Jarke Zhao Heung Lai	Cheung Chiu Hei	Jarvis Ho	
2023	Cheung Chiu Hei	Jarvis Ho	Chow Chit Wang	
2024	Li Jiarui	Jarvis Ho	Chow Chit Wang	
2025	Jarvis Ho	Jiarui Li	Simon Sun	

=== Women's singles ===
Year	Gold	Silver	Bronze	Ref.
2008	Tiffany Wai-Sum Tse	Tze-Ching Lee	Cheryl Leung	
2009	Sumika Yamada	Tiffany Lau Yong Yeu	Charlotte Chan Yue-Kwun	
2010	Shirley Angel Chan	Sumika Yamada	Kyoka Yamada	
2011	Maisy Ma	Sumika Yamada	Tiffany Lau Yong Yeu	
2012	Maisy Ma	Joanna So	Tiffany Lau Yong Yeu	
2013	Maisy Ma	Joanna So	Nathalie Ng	
2014	Maisy Ma	Joanna So	Charlotte Chui Hao Qing	
2015	Yi Christy Leung	Maisy Ma	Joanna So	
2016	Yi Christy Leung	Joanna So	Kwong Hiu Ching	
2017	Yi Christy Leung	Joanna So	Kwong Hiu Ching	
2018	Yi Christy Leung	Kahlen Cheung Cheuk Ka	Chow Hiu Yau	
2019	Chow Hiu Yau	Chow Hiu Lok	Nicole Chan Tsin Nam	
2020	No competition held due to the COVID-19 pandemic			
2021	Megan Wong	Chan Tsz Ching	Chloe Desiree Leung	
2022	Chan Tsz Ching	Chloe Desiree Leung	Akari Yamao	
2023	Chan Tsz Ching	Xue Yun	Megan Wong	
2024	Ariel Guo	Chloe Desiree Leung	Andrea Guo	
2025	Ariel Guo	Yeuk Kwan Zhu	Yun Xue	
2026	Ariel Guo	Yeuk Kwan Zhu	Cheuk Ying Jocelyn Chan	

=== Pairs ===
Year	Gold	Silver	Bronze	Ref.
2013	Marin Ono; To Hon Lam	No other competitors		

=== Ice dance ===
Year	Gold	Silver	Bronze	Ref.
2017	Valerie So; Marcus Yau	No other competitors		
