= Ayane Nakamura =

Japanese figure skater

Personal information
- Born: December 2, 1993 (age 32) Sendai, Japan
- Height: 1.49 m (4 ft 11 in)

Figure skating career
- Country: Japan
- Skating club: Howa SC, Nagoya
- Began skating: 1999
- Retired: 2012
Medal record
Representing Japan
Women's figure skating
Asian Figure Skating Trophy
Gold medal – first place	2010 Asian Trophy	Bangkok

Ayane Nakamura

Japanese name
- Kanji: 中村 愛音
- Kana: なかむら あやね
Transcriptions
- Romanization: Nakamura Ayane

Ayane Nakamura (中村 愛音, Nakamura Ayane; born December 2, 1993) is a Japanese former competitive figure skater. She is the 2010 Asian Trophy champion and competed at three ISU Junior Grand Prix events.

== Programs ==
Season	Short program	Free skating
2007–2008	Sakura, Sakura performed by Richard Clayderman	Rhapsody in Blue by George Gershwin

== Competitive highlights ==
JGP: Junior Grand Prix

International
Event	03–04	04–05	05–06	06–07	07–08	08–09	09–10	10–11	11–12
Asian Trophy								1st	
NRW Trophy							6th		
International: Junior
JGP Austria					4th				
JGP Germany					4th				
JGP Mexico						5th			
Asian Trophy					2nd J				
National
Japan Champ.						9th	12th	20th	24th
Japan Junior			9th	4th	WD	4th			
Japan Novice	1st B	2nd B	1st A	2nd A					
J: Junior level; WD: Withdrew
