= Sin Na-hee =

South Korean figure skater

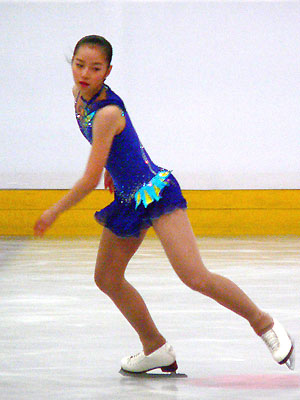
- Sin in 2006.

Personal information
- Born: September 24, 1990 (age 36) Daegu
- Height: 1.65 m (5 ft 5 in)

Figure skating career
- Country: South Korea
- Coach: Chang Sun-mi
Medal record
Representing South Korea
Figure skating: Ladies' singles
Asian Figure Skating Trophy
Bronze medal – third place	2008 Asian Trophy	Hong Kong

- Sin Na-hee
- Hangul: 신나희
- Hanja: 申娜姫
- RR: Sin Nahui
- MR: Sin Nahŭi

Sin Na-hee (born September 24, 1990) is a South Korean figure skater. She represented her country at the 2008 World Junior Championships and finished 17th. She won the bronze medal at the 2008 Asian Figure Skating Trophy. She was born in Daegu.

== Programs ==
Season	Short program	Free skating
2009–2010	Slumdog Millionaire by A. R. Rahman	A Chorus Line by Marvin Hamlisch
2006–2007	Violin Concerto in E Minor by F. Mendelssohn	Madame Butterfly by Giacomo Puccini
2004–2005	Sing, Sing, Sing	Don Quixote by Ludwig Minkus

== Competitive highlights ==
International
Event	04–05	05–06	06–07	07–08	08–09	09–10	10–11
Asian Games			10th				
Asian Trophy					3rd		
Universiade					21st		24th
International: Junior
World Junior Champ.				17th			
JGP Andorra		11th					
JGP Czech Rep.					9th		
JGP Germany	22nd						
JGP Japan		17th					
JGP Netherlands			5th				
JGP Poland						18th	
JGP Romania			9th				
JGP South Africa					13th		
JGP United Kingdom				18th			
JGP United States	15th			5th			
National
South Korean		1st J	4th J	4th	5th	8th	
J = Junior level; JGP = Junior Grand Prix
