= Ariel Guo =

Hong Kong figure skater (born 2010)

Personal information
- Other names: Guo Xingyi; Kwok Hangyee
- Born: October 12, 2010 (age 15) Hong Kong
- Height: 1.6 m (5 ft 3 in)

Figure skating career
- Country: Hong Kong
- Coach: Jialei Wang
Medal record
Figure skating: Women's singles
Representing Hong Kong
Hong Kong Championships
Gold medal – first place	2026 Kowloon Tong	Women's singles

Ariel Guo (Chinese: 郭幸仪; born 12 October 2010) is a Hong Kong figure skater. She is the 2026 Hong Kong national champion and a three time 2026 Hong Kong Junior national champion.

== Personal life ==
Ariel Guo was born on October 12, 2010, in Hong Kong. She has an older sister, Andrea, with whom she shared the 2024 Hong Kong Junior national podium.

In 2026, Guo skated in the ice show Magic on Ice alongside elite skaters, including Olympic silver medalist Alexandra Trusova and World champion pair skaters Pang Qing and Tong Jian.

Guo is the first Hong Kong female figure skater to break the 180-point barrier in the combined total.

== Career ==
=== 2024-25 ===
Guo made her junior international debut at the 2024 Asian Trophy, where she won the silver medal. She made her Junior Grand Prix debut at the 2024 JGP Wuxi, where she placed eighth in the short program and ninth in the free skate to finish in tenth overall. She placed sixth on the junior level and tenth on the senior level at the 2025 Chinese Championships.

Guo failed to qualify for the free skate at the 2025 World Junior Figure Skating Championships after placing twenty-ninth in the short program. First in both segments, she won the junior title at the 2025 Hong Kong Championships in June.

=== 2025-26 ===
Guo began her season at the 2025 Asian Trophy, where she won the silver medal behind Korea's Youn Seo-jin. She finished thirteenth at the 2025 JGP Bangkok and twentieth at the 2025 JGP Abu Dhabi.

She placed fourth on the junior level and eighth on the senior level at the 2026 Chinese Championships. Her twenty-first-place finish in the short program at the 2026 Junior World Championships qualified her for the free skate, where she placed twenty-third. She finished in twenty-third overall. She won the gold medal in the junior division at the 2026 Thai Open, and finished her season by winning gold on the junior and senior levels at the 2026 Hong Kong Championships.

=== 2026-27 ===
Guo began her international season by winning the bronze medal at the 2026 Asian Trophy.

Guo was ninth after the short program but sixth in the free skate to finish seventh overall at the 2026 JGP Xi'an. She finished fifth at the 2026 JGP Batumi with a total score of 183.99, making her the first Hong Kong woman to break the 180-point barrier in the combined total.

== Programs ==
Season	Short program	Free skating
2026–2027	Boom Boom by John Lee Hooker choreo. by Benoît Richaud	Six Beatles Impression: No. 3 by Ron Goodwin choreo. by Kaku Sachico
2025–2026	Now You See Me 2 Fanfare by Brian Tyler choreo. by Kim Hae-jin	Rio by John Powell choreo. by Jialei Wang
2024–2025	Golden by Alexis Ffrench choreo. by Jialei Wang	Rio by John Powell choreo. by Jialei Wang
