= Edward Ka-yin Chow =

Hong Kong figure skater (born 1987)

Edward Ka-yin Chow (Chinese: 周嘉賢; Jyutping: zau^{1} gaa^{1} jin^{4}; born September 3, 1987, in Hong Kong) is a Hong Kong figure skater. He is the 2003, 2005, and 2006 Hong Kong national champion.

== See also ==
- 2007 World Figure Skating Championships
- Sport in Hong Kong
