= Ambience Mall Gurgaon =

Shopping mall in Gurgaon, Haryana, India

Ambience Mall
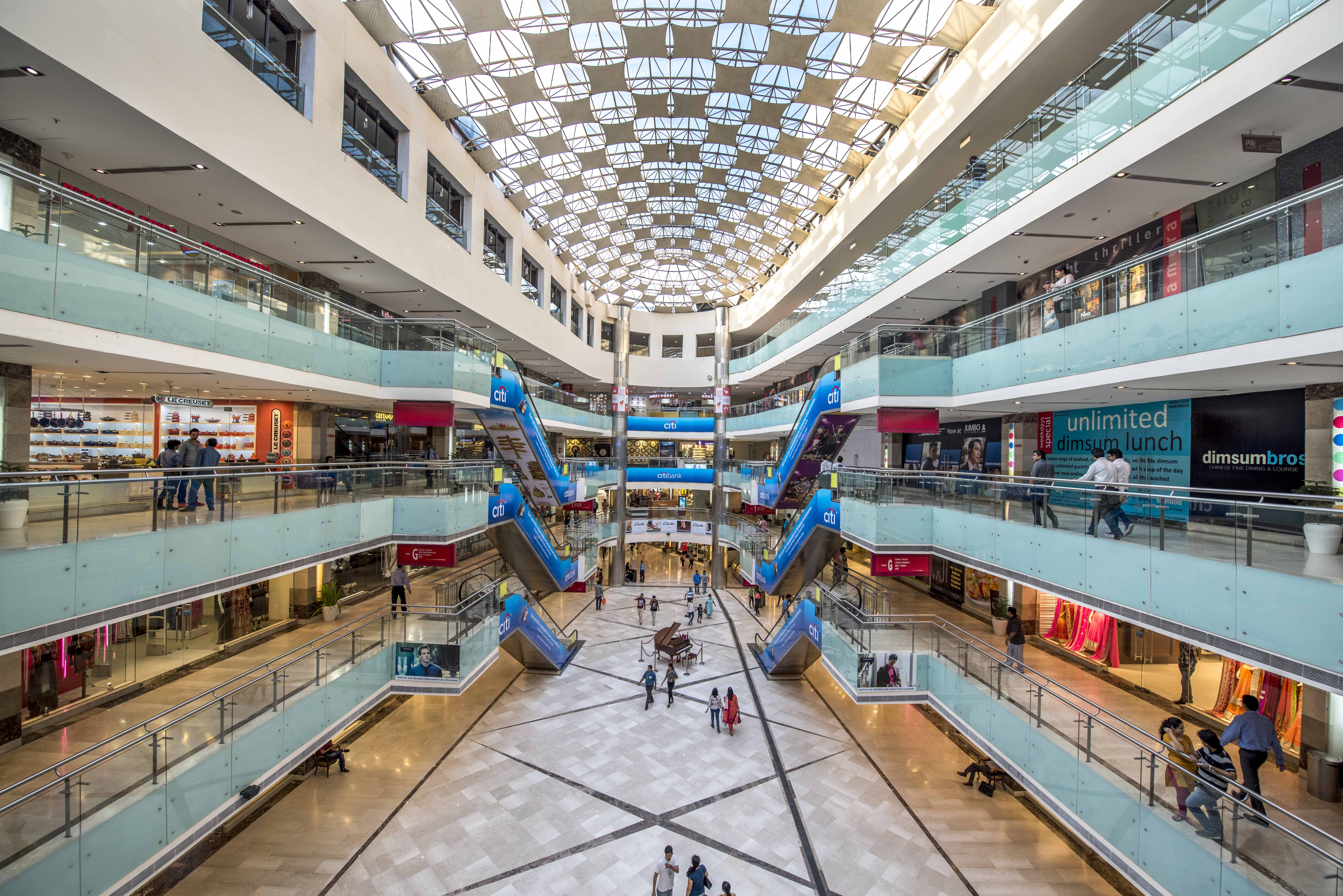
- Ambience Mall, Gurgaon
- Location: Gurgaon, Haryana, India
- Coordinates: 28.503641°N 77.0973407°E
- Opened: 2007
- Owner: Ambience Group
- Num. of stores: 230+
- Floor area: 1.8 million sq ft
- Parking: Approx. 4,000 vehicles
- Public transit: Located along the Delhi–Gurgaon border with access to major arterial roads

Ambience Mall, Gurgaon is a large shopping mall in Gurgaon, Haryana, India. The complex has a total built-up area of 18 lakhs square feet. The mall opened to the public in 2007 and houses national and international retail chains, entertainment areas, and dining outlets.

== History ==
Ambience Mall opened to the public in 2007. The mall hosts public events, seasonal installations, and community activities. In 2016, it was listed at the 13th Annual IMAGES Retail Awards and was included among the British Safety Council’s “Sword of Honor” recipients for 2025.

== Retail and facilities ==
Ambience Mall contains more than 300 stores and food outlets. The parking facility has a capacity for approximately 4,000 vehicles.

== Location ==
Ambience Mall is located on the Delhi–Gurugram border, with access to major arterial roads. It can be reached via the Delhi–Gurugram Expressway, which connects the National Capital Region with Indira Gandhi International Airport.
