= Joanna So =

Hong Kong figure skater

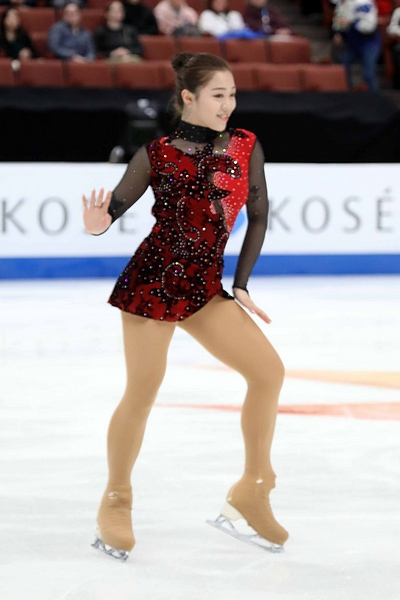
- So at the 2019 Four Continents

Personal information
- Native name: 蘇怡 (Chinese)
- Born: September 7, 1999 (age 27) Hong Kong
- Home town: Hong Kong
- Height: 1.57 m (5 ft 2 in)

Figure skating career
- Country: Hong Kong
- Coach: Lap Kan Lincoln Yuen

Joanna So (Chinese: 蘇怡; pinyin: Sū Yí; born September 7, 1999) is a Hong Kong figure skater. She is the 2021 Asian Open Trophy bronze medalist, the 2022 Asian Open Trophy silver medalist, and a three-time Hong Kong National Champion (2021, 2022, 2023). She has competed in the final segment at three Four Continents Championships (2018, 2019, 2023).

== Programs ==
Season	Short program	Free skating
2025-2026	Good Thing by Zedd & Kehlani choreo. by Derrick Delmore	I See Red by Everybody Loves an Outlaw choreo. by Derrick Delmore
2024–2025	Good Thing by Zedd & Kehlani choreo. by Derrick Delmore	I See Red by Everybody Loves an Outlaw choreo. by Derrick Delmore
2023–2024	Good Thing by Zedd & Kehlani choreo. by Derrick Delmore	I See Red by Everybody Loves an Outlaw choreo. by Derrick Delmore
2022–2023	When You're Good to Mama; All That Jazz (from Chicago) by John Kander, Fred Ebb choreo. by Derrick Delmore	The Phantom of the Opera by Andrew Lloyd Webber performed by Lindsey Stirling choreo. by Derrick Delmore
2021–2022	When You're Good to Mama; All That Jazz (from Chicago) by John Kander, Fred Ebb choreo. by Derrick Delmore	The Phantom of the Opera by Andrew Lloyd Webber performed by Lindsey Stirling choreo. by Derrick Delmore
2018–2019	When You're Good to Mama; All That Jazz (from Chicago) by John Kander, Fred Ebb choreo. by Derrick Delmore	The Phantom of the Opera by Andrew Lloyd Webber performed by Lindsey Stirling choreo. by Derrick Delmore
2017–2018	When You're Good to Mama; All That Jazz (from Chicago) by John Kander, Fred Ebb choreo. by Derrick Delmore	The Phantom of the Opera by Andrew Lloyd Webber performed by Lindsey Stirling choreo. by Derrick Delmore
2016–2017	I love you, I hate you by Raúl Di Blasio choreo. by Justin Dillon	Assassin's Tango (from Mr. & Mrs. Smith) by John Powell choreo. by Justin Dillon
2015–16	I love you, I hate you by Raúl Di Blasio choreo. by Justin Dillon	Assassin's Tango (from Mr. & Mrs. Smith) by John Powell choreo. by Justin Dillon
2014–15	I love you, I hate you by Raúl Di Blasio choreo. by Justin Dillon	Assassin's Tango (from Mr. & Mrs. Smith) by John Powell choreo. by Justin Dillon

== Competitive highlights ==
- JGP – Event of the ISU Junior Grand Prix Series
- CS – Event of the ISU Challenger Series
- TBD- Assigned
- WD - Withdrew from event

Competition placements at senior level
Season	2015–16	2016–17	2017-18	2018-19	2019-20	2020-21	2021-22	2022-23	2023-24	2024-25	2025-26	2026-27
Four Continents			21st	21st			WD	15th	20th			
Chinese Championships			6th						21st		23rd	
Hong Kong Championships			2nd	WD		1st	1st	1st	2nd	2nd		
CS Asian Open Trophy				9th								
CS Nebelhorn Trophy			15th				21st					
Asian Games		12th								12th		
Asian Open Trophy			7th				3rd	2nd	5th		8th	5th
FBMA Trophy		9th										
Golden Bear of Zagreb	6th											
National Winter Games									15th			
NRW Trophy	17th											
Mentor Toruń Cup	17th											
Thailand Open Trophy									2nd	3rd		
World University Games				20th				11th				

Competition placements at junior level
Season	2011–12	2012–13	2013–14	2014-15	2015-16	2016-17	2017-18	2018-19
Hong Kong Championships	2nd	2nd	2nd	3rd	2nd	2nd		
JGP Armenia								20th
JGP France				14th				
JGP Poland							19th	
JGP United States					21st			
Asian Open Trophy				9th	6th	8th		
Skate Down Under			11th					
Egna Spring Trophy					4th	7th		
Hellmut Seibt Memorial				15th				
Lombardia Trophy				15th				
Philadelphia Summer					18th			
Coupe du Printemps						WD		
Taipei Open			6th					
