= Yoniko Eva Washington =

Indian-American figure skater

Yoniko Washington
Personal information
- Full name: Yoniko Eva Washington
- Born: February 21, 1993 (age 33) Muscat, Oman
- Home town: Atlanta, Georgia, U.S.
- Height: 5 ft 3 in (1.60 m)

Figure skating career
- Country: India
- Coach: Aren Nielsen; Kasey Kitsell
- Skating club: ISA of India
- Began skating: 2000

Yoniko Eva Washington (born February 21, 1993) is an Indian-American former competitive figure skater. Born in Oman and raised in the United States, she represented India in international competitions. She is the 2008 Indian national silver medalist, and has competed twice at the World Figure Skating Championships.

== Personal life ==
Washington was born in Muscat in Oman and grew up in Duluth in Georgia. She trained at Atlanta and is a member of the Georgia Figure Skating Club and US Figure Skating. She was also coached by the Olympic champion Barbara Wagner.

== Career ==
Washington won the silver medal at the 5th Indian National Figure Skating Championships held in January 2008 at Shimla. She competed at both the 2009 and 2010, finishing fifty-third and fifty-second, respectively.

== Programs ==
Season	Short program	Free skating
2010–2011	Song of India by Tommy Dorsey	Eternal Melody by Yoshiki
2009–2010	Storm by Ananda Shankar	Eternal Melody by Yoshiki
2008–2009	Desert Rose John Tesh	Music by James Covell by London Symphony Orchestra

== Competitive highlights ==
Results
International
Event	07–08	08–09	09–10	10–11
Worlds		53rd	52nd	
International: Junior
JGP Czech				30th
JGP France		28th		
JGP United Kingdom		24th		
National
Indian Champs.	2nd			
JGP = Junior Grand Prix, PR = Preliminary round
