= Asian Distance Speed Skating Championships =

Speed skating competition

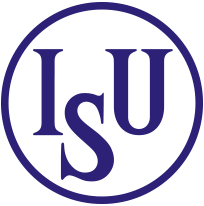
- Status: active
- Genre: sporting event
- Date: varying
- Frequency: annual
- Country: varying
- Inaugurated: 1994
- Organiser: International Skating Union

Asian Distance Speed Skating Championships was held from 1994 to 2015 in Asia for Speed Skating.

== Summary ==
Year	Host
1994	Japan
1995	Mongolia
1996	not held
1997	Japan
1998	Japan
1999	Japan
2000	Mongolia
2001	China
1996	not held
2003	China
2004	South Korea
2005	Japan
2006	China
2007	China
2008	China
2009	Japan
2010	Japan
2011	China
2012	Kazakhstan
2013	China
2014	Japan
2015	China

== See also ==
- Asian Speed Skating Championships
