= Tatsuya Tanaka (figure skater) =

Japanese figure skater (born 1988)

Personal information
- Born: October 27, 1988 (age 37) Taipei, Taiwan
- Height: 175 cm (5 ft 9 in)

Figure skating career
- Country: Hong Kong
- Coach: Koji Okajima, Yutaka Higuchi, Hanae Yokoya
- Retired: 2007

Tatsuya Tanaka (Japanese: 田中達也, born October 27, 1988, in Taipei, Taiwan) is a Japanese figure skater who competes internationally for Hong Kong. Tanaka is the three time Hong Kong national silver medalist. He is a five-season competitor on the Junior Grand Prix circuit.
