= Sarvesh Amte =

Indian Speed Skater

Personal information
- Nationality: Indian
- Born: 19 August 1994 Belgaum, Karnataka India
- Occupation: Skater
- Years active: 2009 – present
- Employer: Roller Skating Federation of India
- Height: 180.34 cm (71.00 in)

Sport
- Country: India
- Sport: Speed skating

Achievements and titles
- World finals: World Slalom Series 2012

Sarvesh Amte is an Indian inline speed skater, inline hockey player and speed slalom player who represented India in World Slalom Series 2012.

He is from Belagavi, Karnataka, India. He started skating in 2010.

He is an Indian skating champion and holds more than 10 World Records in skating.

He also played inline hockey for state level and national matches.

== Competitions ==
Representing India
| Year | Competition |
|---|---|
| 2011 | Longest outdoor Inline Hockey World Record 2011 India |
| 2011 | Longest Roller Skating Marathon World Record 2011 India |
| 2012 | World Slalom Series 2012 held at Lishui, China |
| 2016 | Largest Roller Skating Relay World Record 2016 India |
| 2016 | Largest Roller Skating Relay World Record 2016 India |
| 2016 | Guinness World Record at Belagavi 2016 India |
