= Asian Skating Union =

International sports governing body

- Sport: Ice skating
- Jurisdiction: Asia
- Abbreviation: ASU
- Headquarters: Gangnam, Seoul
- President: Chang Myong-Hi
- Secretary: Jason Jung

The Asian Skating Union (ASU) is the Asian governing body for competitive ice skating disciplines, including figure skating, synchronized skating, speed skating, and short track speed skating. It is based in Seoul, South Korea.

== ASU Championships ==
- Asian Open Figure Skating Trophy
- Asian Speed Skating Championships
- Asian Short Track Speed Skating Trophy
