= Hounsh Munshi =

Indian figure skater

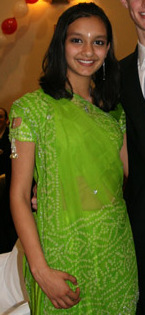
- Munshi at the banquet of the 2008 Junior Worlds

Personal information
- Full name: Hounsh Munshi
- Born: 12 September 1993 (age 32) Bangkok, Thailand
- Height: 1.7 m (5 ft 7 in)

Figure skating career
- Country: India
- Coach: Val Prudsky; Elena Prudsky; B. L. Wylie

Hounsh Munshi (born 12 September 1993) is an Indian former figure skater. She is the 2007-2008 season Indian bronze medalist. Her family is from India, and Munshi has also lived in Sydney, Australia, before moving with her family to the United States. She was coached by Tiffany Chin.
