= International Skating Union =

International governing body for competitive ice skating

- Sport: Ice skating
- Jurisdiction: International
- Membership: 102 members from 80 nations (April 2022): Andorra Argentina Armenia Azerbaijan Australia Belgium Bosnia and Herzegovina Brazil Bulgaria Chile China Chinese Taipei Denmark Germany Estonia Finland France Georgia Greece Hong Kong India Indonesia Ireland Iceland Israel Italy Japan Cambodia Canada Kazakhstan Qatar Kyrgyzstan Colombia North Korea South Korea Croatia Latvia Liechtenstein Lithuania Luxembourg Malaysia Mexico Moldova Monaco Mongolia Morocco New Zealand Netherlands North Macedonia Norway Austria Peru Philippines Poland Romania Russia Sweden Switzerland Serbia Singapore Slovakia Slovenia Spain South Africa Thailand Czech Republic Turkey Ukraine Hungary Uzbekistan United Arab Emirates United States Great Britain Vietnam Belarus Cyprus Portugal Egypt Kuwait Turkmenistan
- Abbreviation: ISU
- Founded: 23 July 1892; 134 years ago in Scheveningen, Netherlands
- Affiliation: IOC
- Headquarters: Chemin de Brillancourt 4, Lausanne, Switzerland
- President: Jae Youl Kim
- Vice presidents: Benoit Lavoie (figure skating); Tron Espeli (speed skating)
- Director: Colin Smith
- Operating income: ▲CHF 35.86 million (2023)

Official website
- www.isu.org
- Official language: English (Note: French, German and Russian are supplementary languages of the ISU.)

The International Skating Union (ISU) is the international governing body for competitive ice skating disciplines, including figure skating, synchronized skating, speed skating, and short track speed skating. It was founded in Scheveningen, Netherlands, in July 1892, making it one of the oldest international sport federations. The ISU was formed to establish standardized international rules and regulations for the skating disciplines it governs, and to organize international competitions in these disciplines. It is now based in Switzerland. As of April 2022, the ISU has 102 members from 80 nations. It is affiliated with the IOC. Jae Youl Kim serves as the president of the ISU.

== History ==
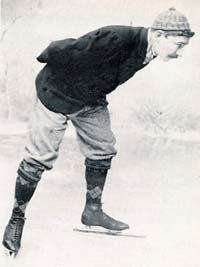
Jaap Eden of the Netherlands, three-times World Allround Speed Skating Champion, having won the titles in 1893 (the year after the ISU was founded), 1895, and 1896

The International Skating Union (ISU) (Note: Originally internationale Eislauf Vereinigung in the German language) was founded in 1892 in the Dutch seaside town of Scheveningen. The meeting was attended by 15 men, as the national association representatives from the Netherlands, Great Britain, Germany/Austria, and two clubs from Stockholm (Sweden) and Budapest (Hungary). The ISU was the first international winter sports federation to govern speed skating and figure skating, as it laid down the rules for speed skating, shortly followed by figure skating. In 1895, the organization streamlined its mission to deal only with amateur competitors, not professionals, and hosted its first amateur skating championship in February 1896 in Saint Petersburg, Russia.

The United States and Canada formed a competing organization, the International Skating Union of America (ISUA), in 1907. Over the next two years, 12 European nations had joined the ISU, while the ISUA had only its original two members. The ISUA folded in 1927.

European and North American figure skaters rarely competed against each other because of differences in their styles of skating. The ISU had "systematized and arranged" the sport of figure skating, with competitions including "a selection of ten or twelve numbers from the ISU programme, ... five minutes' free skating to music, ... [and] special figures" on one foot. According to figure skating historian James R. Hines, the ISU was formed due to the necessity of establishing a schedule of compulsory figures and to adopt the international style of figure skating used outside of North America and Great Britain. In 1911, Canada joined the ISU, leaving the United States as the only major competitor to not be a member. This changed in 1923, when the United States Figure Skating Association joined the ISU and in 1926, the Japanese sport governing body followed to acquire ISU membership.

The first ISU competitions to emerge were the World and European Speed Skating and Figure Skating Championships. Both disciplines were included in the official program of the first Winter Olympic Games in Chamonix in 1924. The discipline of ice dancing was introduced at the Innsbruck Games in 1976. After 1945, the ISU slowly continued to grow with accession of members from other countries in Europe, Oceania, and (Southern) Africa.

The ISU celebrated its 75th anniversary in 1967, when they published 75 Years of European and World Championships. The organization was unable to celebrate its 25th and 50th anniversaries in 1917 and 1942 due to the two world wars. In 1991, the ISU celebrated its 100th anniversary.

In 1967, the ISU adopted short track speed skating. The first official ISU World Championships in speed skating took place in 1981. Short track speed skating became part of the official Olympic program in 1992. The earliest speed skating competitions hosted by the ISU, between 1976 and 1980, were held under different names but have retrospectively received World Championship status. The discipline was known as "indoor speed skating" at first, until being renamed "short track speed skating" when indoor rinks for the longer speed skating events were introduced.

By 1988, 38 nations had joined the ISU. Over the next few years, the organization abandoned one of its long-held practices, eliminating the use of mandatory figures in the singles' figure skating competitions and reducing their use in ice dancing. During the 1970s and 1980s, several Asian countries joined the ISU, followed in the early 1990s by many new countries emerging from the breakup of the USSR, Yugoslavia and Czechoslovakia. In 1994, synchronized skating was formally recognized as a separate discipline, and the first ISU World Championships were held in 2000 in Minneapolis, Minnesota.

After the 2002 Winter Olympics in Salt Lake City, Utah, the ISU implemented changes to many of its events. The ISU approved the use of video replay, when available, to review referee decisions. The rules for judging figure skating were also overhauled as a direct result of the 2002 Olympic Winter Games figure skating scandal. According to Ottavio Cinquanta, former president of the ISU, "'Something was wrong there,' ... 'Not just the individual but also the system. It existed for 70 years. Now we are trying to replace one system with another.'" A new judging system for figure skating took effect in 2005, replacing the 6.0 system of "perfect" scores and instead giving points for various technical elements.

Since the 2000s, the ISU has experienced a new wave of expansion, with several countries in Asia and Latin America joining the organization. In 2019, skating federations from Chile, Peru, Turkmenistan, and Vietnam acquired membership to the ISU.

== ISU Members ==
Member countries of the International Skating Union. European members Non-European members (four continents)

=== Regions ===
List of 80 Countries (102 Associations, Some nations have 2 organization member) in 5 Zones (Updated at 7 May 2025):

1. Four Continents (4C) (non-European countries): 35 Members
2. European Countries: 45 Members

Number	Region	Countries
Four Continents (4C)
1	Africa	3
2	Asia	21
3	Oceania	2
4	Americas	9
European
5	Europe	45
Total	World	80

=== Year of Membership ===
- Africa:
1. Egypt - 2022
2. South Africa - 1938/1938
3. Morocco - 2011
- Asia:
1. China - 1956/1956
2. Hong Kong - 1983
3. Indonesia - 2013
4. India - 2003
5. Japan - 1926
6. Kazakhstan - 1992
7. Kuwait - 2022
8. Kyrgyzstan - 2014
9. South Korea - 1948
10. Malaysia - 2009
11. Mongolia - 1960
12. Philippines - 2004
13. North Korea - 1957
14. Qatar - 2014
15. Singapore - 2008
16. Thailand - 1988
17. Turkmenistan - 2019
18. Chinese Taipei - 1983
19. United Arab Emirates - 2013
20. Uzbekistan - 1992
21. Vietnam - 2019
- Oceania:
1. Australia - 1932/1957
2. New Zealand - 1964/1983
- Americas:
1. Argentina - 2004/2006
2. Brazil - 2002
3. Canada - 1894/1947
4. Chile - 2019
5. Colombia - 2015
6. Ecuador - 2021
7. Mexico - 1987
8. Peru - 2019
9. United States - 1923/1965
- Europe:
1. Andorra - 1995
2. Armenia - 1994
3. Austria - 1995
4. Azerbaijan - 1993
5. Belgium - 1979/1979
6. Bosnia and Herzegovina - 1994
7. Belarus - 1992
8. Bulgaria - 1967
9. Croatia - 1992
10. Cyprus - 1995
11. Czech Republic - 1923/1991
12. Denmark - 1913
13. Spain - 1956
14. Estonia - 1928
15. Finland - 1908/1960
16. France - 1908
17. Great Britain - 1892
18. Georgia - 1992
19. Germany - 1950/1950
20. Greece - 2015
21. Hungary - 1908
22. Ireland - 2008
23. Iceland - 2000
24. Israel - 1992
25. Italy - 1927
26. Latvia - 1926
27. Liechtenstein - 2014
28. Lithuania - 1980/1980
29. Luxembourg - 1971/1996
30. Moldova - 2014
31. North Macedonia - 2017
32. Monaco - 2003
33. Netherlands - 1892
34. Norway - 1894
35. Poland - 1925/1987
36. Portugal - 2021
37. Romania - 1933
38. Russia - 1896
39. Slovenia - 1992
40. Serbia - 2006
41. Switzerland - 1896/1911
42. Slovakia - 1993/1998
43. Sweden - 1892/1905/1946
44. Turkey - 1990
45. Ukraine - 1992/1992

== ISU Championships ==
In addition to sanctioning other international competitions, the ISU designates the following competitions each year as "ISU Championships":

=== Long track speed skating ===
- World Allround Speed Skating Championships (1893–)
- World Single Distances Speed Skating Championships (1996–, held only in non-Olympic years, except for in 1998)
- World Sprint Speed Skating Championships (1972–)
- World Junior Speed Skating Championships (1974–)
- European Speed Skating Championships (1893–)
- Asian Speed Skating Championships (1999–2014)
- North American and Oceania Speed Skating Championships (1999–2014) Wereldkampioenschap schaatsen allround kwalificatie (Noord-Amerika & Oceanië)
- Four Continents Speed Skating Championships (2020–)

=== Figure skating ===
- World Figure Skating Championships (1896–)
- World Junior Figure Skating Championships (1976–)
- European Figure Skating Championships (1891–)
- Asian Figure Skating Championships (1912–1998)
- North American and Oceania Figure Skating Championships (1912–1998)
- Four Continents Figure Skating Championships (1999–)

=== Short track speed skating ===
- World Short Track Speed Skating Championships (1976–)
- World Short Track Speed Skating Team Championships (1991–2011)
- World Junior Short Track Speed Skating Championships (1994–)
- European Short Track Speed Skating Championships (1997–)
- Asian Distance Speed Skating Championships (1994-2015)
- Asian Short Track Speed Skating Championships (2007-2014) ?
- Asian Short Track Speed Skating Trophy (2019-) ?
- Four Continents Short Track Speed Skating Championships (2020–)

=== Synchronized skating ===
- World Synchronized Skating Championships (2000–)
- World Junior Synchronized Skating Championships (2013–)

=== Veteran ===
- World Veterans Figure Skating Championships
- World Veterans Speed Skating Championships
- World Veterans Short Track Speed Skating Championships

=== Olympic ===
The events such as the Olympic Winter Games and the ISU Grand Prix of Figure Skating are not ISU Championships. However, they do count towards Personal Best scores.

== ISU Cups and Grand Prixs ==
- ISU Speed Skating World Cup - 1985
- ISU Short Track Speed Skating World Cup - 1998–2024
- ISU Short Track World Tour - 2025
- ISU Grand Prix of Figure Skating - 1995
- ISU Junior Grand Prix of Figure Skating - 1997

== First world championships ==
Dates and locations of first world championships in various disciplines held under the auspices of the ISU:

- 1893: Speed skating (men only), Amsterdam
- 1896: Figure skating (men only), St. Petersburg
- 1906: Figure skating (ladies), Davos
- 1908: Figure skating (pairs), St. Petersburg
- 1936: Speed skating (women), Stockholm
- 1952: Figure skating (ice dance), Paris
- 1970: Sprint speed skating, West Allis, Wisconsin
- 1978: Short track speed skating, Solihull, UK
- 2000: Synchronized skating, Minneapolis

== Medals (Figure Skating) ==
=== Overall Medals (Stage 1 + Stage 2) ===
Medals awarded to the skaters who achieved the highest overall placements in each discipline.

=== Small Medals ===
The short program, along with the free skating program, is a segment of single skating, pair skating, and synchronized skating in international competitions and events for both junior and senior-level skaters. It has been previously called the "original" or "technical" program. The short program was added to single skating in 1973, which created a three-part competition until compulsory figures were eliminated in 1990. The short program for pair skating was introduced at the 1963 European Championships, the 1964 World Championships, and the Olympics in 1968; previously, pair skaters only had to perform the free skating program in competitions. Synchronized skating has always had two competition segments, the short program and free skating.

Small Medals awarded only at ISU Championships since probably 2009:

Stage 1 = Small medals awarded to the skaters who achieved the highest short program or rhythm dance placements in each discipline.

Stage 2 = Small medals awarded to the skaters who achieved the highest free skating or free dance placements in each discipline.

Small Medals awarded only at ISU Championships:

1. World Figure Skating Championships
2. World Junior Figure Skating Championships
3. European Figure Skating Championships
4. Four Continents Figure Skating Championships

Small Medals not awarded in:

1. Figure skating at the Olympic Games
2. ISU Grand Prix of Figure Skating
3. or any other international competitions

== Cooperation with other sports ==
The ISU has an agreement with the Federation of International Bandy to use the same arenas. The cooperation between the two federations is increasing, since both have an interest in more indoor venues with large ice surfaces being built.

== Organization ==
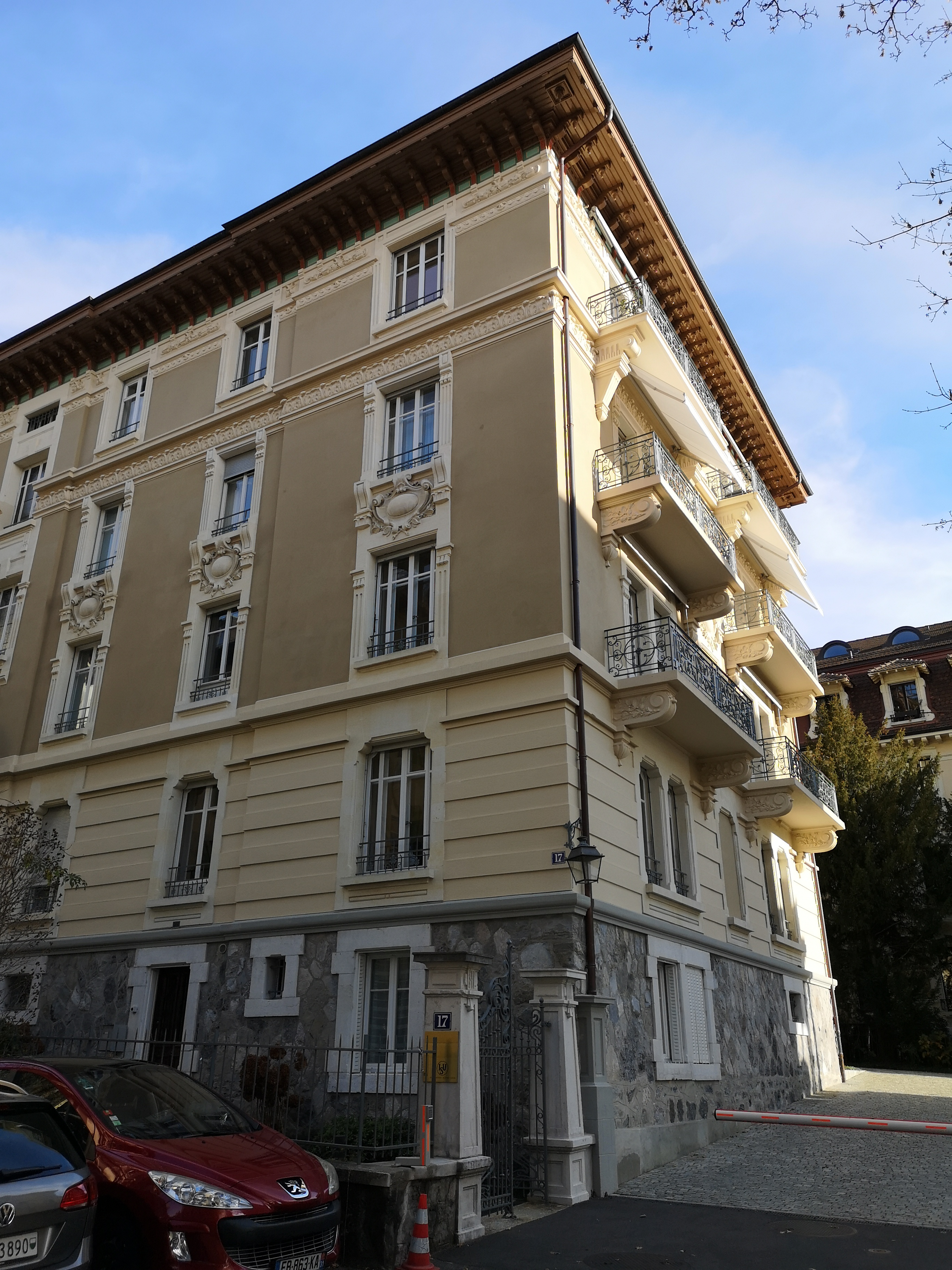
Headquarters in Lausanne

The ISU is an international sport federation recognised by the International Olympic Committee as the body globally administering figure skating and speed skating sports with the following disciplines: Speed skating, Single & Pair skating, Ice dance, Short track speed skating, and Synchronized skating. Whereas the individual national associations administer these sports at the national level, all international matters are under the sole jurisdiction and control of the ISU. The ISU has been headquartered in Lausanne, Switzerland, since 1947. Also in 1947, English was adopted as the ISU's official language.

There was an attempt to set up an alternative association to replace the ISU for governing and promoting figure skating throughout the world. In March 2003, a group of several former figure skating champions (who at the time were still practicing as coaches, judges, referees) announced the creation of a new international governing body for figure skating, the World Skating Federation ("WSF"). This attempt ultimately failed.

ISU is organized as an association pursuant to Swiss laws (art. 60 of Swiss Civil Code). It has its own legal identity and falls under the jurisdiction of Switzerland. Articles of Association define ISU's purpose as

The objectives of the ISU are regulating, governing and promoting the sports of Figure and Speed Skating and their organized development on the basis of friendship and mutual understanding between sportsmen.The ISU shall work for broadening interest in Figure and Speed Skating sports by increasing their popularity, improving their quality and increasing the number of participants throughout the world. The ISU shall ensure that the interests of all ISU Members are observed and respected.

The ISU Statutes consist of the ISU Constitution including its Procedural Provisions, and ISU General Regulations setting out framework principles. More detailed provisions are contained in Special Regulations and Technical Rules for Single & Pair Skating and Ice Dance, Synchronized Skating Speed Skating, and Short Track Speed Skating. The ISU Code of Ethics, the ISU Anti-Doping Rules, and ISU Anti-Doping Procedures contain further guidelines. Additional provisions and updates can also be found in ad-hoc published ISU Communications.

=== Members ===
The members of the ISU are the individual national associations whose task is to administer figure and speed skating on ice at the national level. Members are typically composed of skating clubs and athletes are individual members of those clubs. As of 20 February 2020, the International Skating Union counts 98 members.

==== Russia and Belarus suspension ====
After the 2022 Russian invasion of Ukraine, the ISU issued Communication No. 2469, banning all Russian and Belarusian athletes from events until further notice. On 28 March 2023 the International Olympic Committee (IOC) issued a statement recommending that Russian and Belarusian athletes be allowed to compete under a neutral flag. On 11 June 2023 the ISU responded to the IOC 28 March statement, saying that the ISU Council "decided to explore the feasibility issues with regard to potential pathways to implement the IOC recommendations within ISU Sports. ...The Council will continue to monitor the situation in Ukraine and its impact on the ISU activity as well as the decisions and their implementation within the Olympic Movement. In the meantime, ISU Communication 2469 remains in force". On 28 July the IOC responded to questions about its position.

The suspension was extended in 2023, 2024 and 2025.

=== ISU Congress ===
The highest-ranking body of the ISU is the ISU Congress which consists of the ISU Members. The Congress meets once every two years for an ordinary meeting. Ordinary resolutions are passed by a simple majority of votes of the ISU Members represented and voting at a Congress. Proposals require a two-thirds majority of ISU Members in favor in order to be accepted.

Since the ISU's inception in 1892, 59 ordinary meetings in total have been organized.

1. 1892 – Netherlands, Scheveningen
2. 1895 – Denmark, Copenhagen
3. 1897 – Sweden, Stockholm
4. 1899 – United Kingdom, London
5. 1901 – Germany, Berlin
6. 1903 – Hungary, Budapest
7. 1905 – Denmark, Copenhagen
8. 1907 – Sweden, Stockholm
9. 1909 – Netherlands, Amsterdam
10. 1911 – Austria, Vienna
11. 1913 – Hungary, Budapest
12. 1921 – Netherlands, Amsterdam
13. 1923 – Denmark, Copenhagen
14. 1925 – Switzerland, Davos
15. 1927 – France, Bagnères-de-Luchon
16. 1929 – Norway, Oslo
17. 1931 – Austria, Vienna
18. 1933 – Czechoslovakia, Prague
19. 1935 – Sweden, Stockholm
20. 1937 – Switzerland, St.Moritz
21. 1939 – Netherlands, Amsterdam
22. 1947 – Norway, Oslo
23. 1949 – France, Paris
24. 1951 – Denmark, Copenhagen
25. 1953 – Italy, Stresa
26. 1955 – Switzerland, Lausanne
27. 1957 – Austria, Salzburg
28. 1959 – France, Tours
29. 1961 – Norway, Bergen
30. 1963 – Finland, Helsinki
31. 1965 – Austria, Vienna
32. 1967 – Netherlands, Amsterdam
33. 1969 – United Kingdom, Maidenhead
34. 1971 – Italy, Venice
35. 1973 – Denmark, Copenhagen
36. 1975 – West Germany, Munich
37. 1977 – France, Paris
38. 1980 – Switzerland, Davos
39. 1982 – Norway, Stavanger
40. 1984 – United States, Colorado Springs
41. 1986 – Austria, Velden am Wörther See
42. 1988 – Switzerland, Davos
43. 1990 – New Zealand, Christchurch
44. 1992 – Switzerland, Davos
45. 1994 – United States, Boston
46. 1996 – Switzerland, Davos
47. 1998 – Sweden, Stockholm
48. 2000 – Canada, Quebec
49. 2002 – Japan, Kyoto
50. 2004 – Netherlands, Scheveningen
51. 2006 – Hungary, Budapest
52. 2008 – Monaco, Monaco
53. 2010 – Spain, Barcelona
54. 2012 – Malaysia, Kuala Lumpur
55. 2014 – Ireland, Dublin
56. 2016 – Croatia, Dubrovnik
57. 2018 – Spain, Seville
58. 2022 – Thailand, Phuket
59. 2024 – United States, Las Vegas
60. 2026 – Spain, Tenerife

=== ISU Council ===
The ISU Council constitutes the highest ISU body between two Congresses. It is the executive body of the ISU and is responsible for determining the policies of the ISU and deciding upon the general coordination of the ISU structure and strategy. The Council consists of the president, a vice president, and five members for the Figure Skating Branch and a vice president, and five members for the Speed Skating Branch.

In 1967, Jacques Favart, who was the ISU's vice president for figure skating, replaced Ernst Labin as ISU president due to Labin's death six weeks after taking office; Favart served for the next 13 years. Also in 1967, Sonia Bianchetti of Italy became the first woman council member.

The council is assisted by the Director General and the ISU Secretariat. The Director General is responsible for the daily management of all business and financially related activities of the ISU and the operation of the Secretariat.

As of the summer of 2008, the ISU consisted of 63 member nations, with a governing council of 11. To add any proposal to the agenda of meetings, it must have support from four-fifths of the members. Proposals on the agenda are approved with a two-thirds majority vote.

==== Presidents of the ISU ====
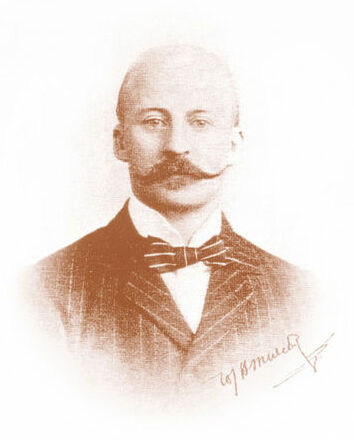
The first ISU President, Pim Mulier

1. 1892–1895 Netherlands, Pim Mulier
2. 1895–1925 Sweden, Viktor Balck
3. 1925–1937 Sweden, Ulrich Salchow
4. 1937–1945 Netherlands, Gerrit W. A. van Laer
5. 1945–1953 United Kingdom, Herbert J. Clarke
6. 1953–1967 Switzerland, James Koch
7. 1967–1967 Austria, Ernst Labin
8. 1967–1980 France, Jacques Favart
9. 1980–1994 Norway, Olaf Poulsen
10. 1994–2016 Italy, Ottavio Cinquanta
11. 2016–2022 Netherlands, Jan Dijkema
12. 2022–present South Korea, Kim Jae-youl

=== ISU Commissions and Committees ===
Following the ISU Congress 2018, the organizational chart of the ISU includes alongside the ISU Congress and ISU Council, assisted by the ISU Secretariat, the following bodies:

1. ISU Disciplinary Commission
2. ISU Athletes Commission
3. ISU Medical Commission
4. ISU Development Commission
5. ISU Technical Committees.

The ISU Disciplinary Commission (DC) constitutes a judicial body of the ISU. It is an independent body elected by the ISU Congress.

The ISU Athletes Commission was introduced on the 56th ISU Ordinary Congress 2016 in Dubrovnik and represents Skaters’ positions within the ISU by providing advice to the ISU Council, Technical Committees, Sports Directors, Director General and other internal bodies.

The ISU Medical Commission coordinates compliance with anti-doping regulations.

The ISU Development Commission implements the ISU Development Program in accordance with the ISU policy and the approved budget.

The main functions of the ISU Technical Committees include the preparation, monitoring and maintenance of the Technical Rules. The following Technical Committees are established: Single and Pair Skating, Ice Dance, Synchronized Skating, Speed Skating and Short Track Speed Skating.

=== Eligibility rules ===
ISU's role as an international sports federation involves setting the rules to ensure proper governance of sport, notably in terms of the health and safety of the athletes and the integrity of competitions. Similar to many international sports federations, ISU adopted eligibility rules. Under the ISU eligibility rules, skaters participating in competitions that are not approved by the ISU face severe penalties up to a lifetime ban from all major international skating events.

Historically, only amateurs were allowed to qualify for the Olympic Games and in 1962, the IOC issued the Eligibility rules which specified that persons receiving remuneration and other material advantages for participation in sport were not eligible to compete in the Olympic Games. However, the concept of amateur sport developed over time, moving by the end of the 1980s towards professionalisation. Respecting the Olympic principles, the ISU rules made a difference in treatment of amateur and professional skaters wishing to qualify for the Olympic Games. In 1986, the limitations imposed on professional skaters were removed and the categories of "eligible" and "ineligible" persons were introduced to replace the concepts of "amateurs" and "professionals". In 1998, Eligibility rules established a comprehensive pre-authorisation system by stipulating that eligible skaters could only take part in competitions approved by the ISU, and conducted under the ISU Regulations by ISU-approved officials. Under the 2014 Eligibility rules, the person who breached the Eligibility rules could not be reinstated. This resulted in a lifetime ban, since the loss of eligibility is not limited in time.

There were attempts of independent organisers to hold alternative speed skating events.

Icederby International co., Ltd sought to set up a series of events titled ‘Icederby Grand Prix’ scheduled to run for six consecutive years from 2014 to 2020. Run by a Korean event organiser, it offered unprecedented prize money to attract the world's best skaters. In 2011, Icederby International approached the ISU to enter into a partnership agreement and presented its action plan. Initially, Icederby included betting in connection with its planned Grand Prix in countries where betting was not prohibited. In January 2012, the ISU updated its Code of Ethics to rule out the participation in all forms of betting. Two years later, Icederby notified the ISU that no betting would be organised in connection with the planned Dubai Icederby Grand Prix as betting is illegal in Dubai. Nonetheless, the ISU did not authorise the Dubai Icederby Grand Prix 2014 and announced that all skaters who take part in the Icederby event would be subject to the lifetime ban established by the Eligibility rules. In consequence, Icederby decided not to organise the Dubai Icederby Grand Prix 2014 due to its difficulty to secure the participation of speed skaters.

Two professional speed skaters, Mark Tuitert and Niels Kerstholt, lodged a complaint and on 5 October 2015, the European Commission initiated formal antitrust proceedings into alleged anti-competitive restrictions imposed by the International Skating Union on athletes and officials' economic activities and alleged foreclosure of competing alternative sport event organisers.

On 20 October 2015, the ISU published the procedure for independent organisers to receive authorisation from the ISU Council. Under the 2016 Eligibility rules, the sanctions imposed on a skater participating in non-authorised events ranged from a warning to periods of ineligibility running from an unspecified minimum to a maximum of a lifetime.

In December 2017, the European Commission decided that ISU's eligibility rules breach EU competition laws. The Commission gave the ISU 90 days to amend the rules and did not impose a fine. The ISU disagreed with the decision, suspended the enforcement of the rules subject to the Commission decision, and put in place provisional rules. In addition, the ISU filed an appeal against the EU Commission decision pending before the EU General Court.

=== Commercial aspects ===
Financial data (in CHF millions)
Year	2018	2019	2020	2021	2022	2023
Revenue	35.61	▲39.64	▼25.61	▲27.78	▲35.52	▲35.86
Net income/(loss)	(0.23)	▲2.01	▼(4.65)	▲(0.25)	▼(19.07)	▲(3.57)
Assets	324.28	▼321.20	▼296.49	▼290.20	▼285.56	▼276.93

The ISU, as an Olympic Winter Sport Federation, derives its revenues from

1. Broadcast partnerships for world-wide media coverage of ISU Events;
2. Sponsorship agreements;
3. Contributions provided by the IOC for the Winter/ Youth Olympic Games; and
4. Interest income earned from the ISU's financial assets.

In 2018, the ISU generated a worldwide consolidated turnover of CHF 35.6 million, as compared to CHF 36.9 million for the financial year 2017.

For the financial year 2018, the operating income for Television ISU Events (net) amounted to around 17 million CHF, and for advertising events (sponsorship agreements) to around 6.9 million CHF.

Whereas the situation regarding TV events appears to be relatively stable, the conclusion of sponsorship agreements becomes more challenging due to a highly competitive market environment. Thus, ISU has been unable to replace the Speed Skating Title Sponsor with a similarly lucrative agreement. Also, as ISU Members in China and the Republic of Korea were, for different reasons, unable to host ISU Short Track Speed Skating Events during the 2018/19 season, the ISU was also unable to maintain sponsorship agreements in those countries.

As the ISU sport disciplines significantly contribute to the success of the Olympic Winter Games, the ISU can also continue to rely on substantial amounts provided by the IOC. After the successful 2018 Olympic Winter Games (OWG) in South Korea, these incomes have increased as compared to the 2014 OWG in Sochi and are again close to the level of the 2010 OWG of Vancouver.

To ensure a substantial annual interest income independent from commercial partners’ interests, the ISU employs a long-standing investment policy. The interest income on high-rated bonds from Credit Suisse, Banque Cantonale Vaudoise, and UBS accrued at the end of the financial year 2018 amounted to CHF 1.44 million.

In 2020 the ISU launched the ISU Skating Awards. The winners of the inaugural edition were Yuzuru Hanyu (Most Valuable Skater), Gabriella Papadakis / Guillaume Cizeron (Most Entertaining Program), Alena Kostornaia (Best Newcomer), Madison Chock / Evan Bates (Best Costume), Eteri Tutberidze (Best Coach), Shae-Lynn Bourne (Best Choreographer) and Kurt Browning (Lifetime Achievement Award).

== See also ==
- International figure skating
- List of international sport federations
- Long track speed skating
- Figure skating
- Short track speed skating
- Synchronized skating
- ISU Figure Skating Championships
- Ice Skating Institute Asia (ISIAsia)

== Works cited ==
- Hines, James R. (2011). Historical Dictionary of Figure Skating. Lanham, Maryland: Scarecrow Press. ISBN 978-0-8108-6859-5.
