= Nishchay Luthra =

Indian figure skater (born 1999)

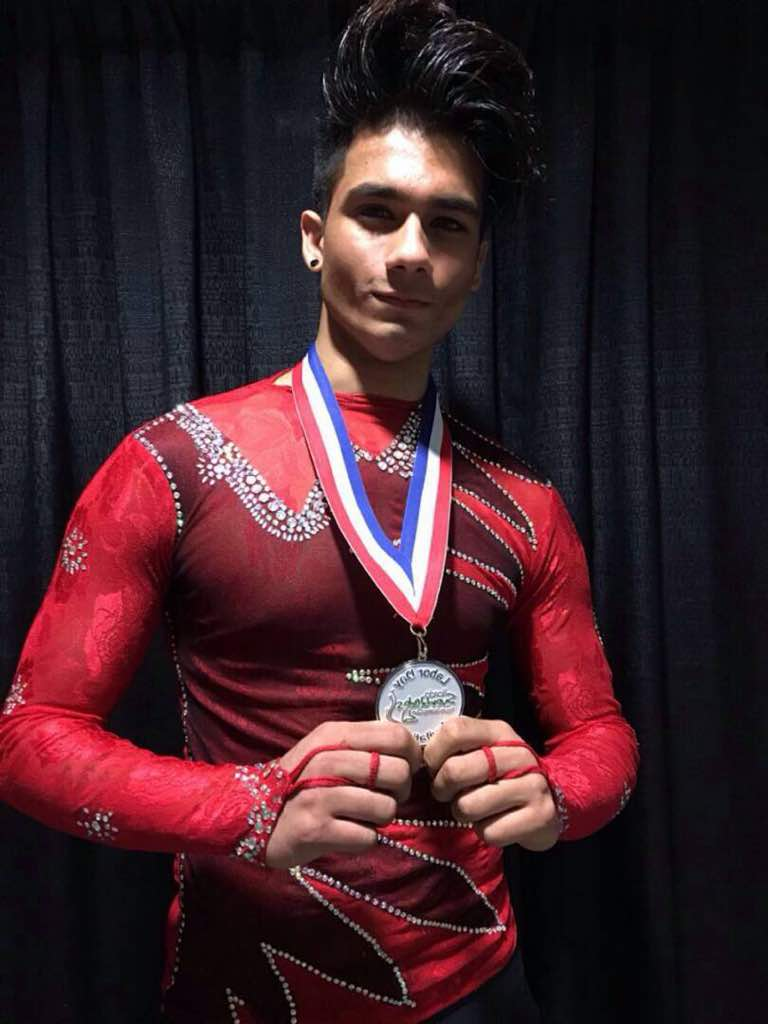
- Luthra with his silver medal at Labour Day Competition 2016 – Florida

Personal information
- Born: 9 March 1999 (age 26)
- Height: 5 ft 8 in (173 cm)

Figure skating career
- Country: India

Nishchay Luthra (born 9 March 1999) is an Indian figure skater. He has competed in men's singles and pairs. He has won four international medals for India and was a 9-time Indian national gold medalist.

== Personal life ==
Nishchay Luthra was born in New Delhi, India. Before focusing on figure skating, he played basketball, taekwondo and cricket. He has a younger sister. Nishchay finished high school at The Indian School in New Delhi.

== Career ==
Nishchay started as a [roller skater] at the age of 10. His mother had searched online for a skating coach and found Vasudev Tandi, who taught Nishchay the basic moves and helped him graduate to ice-skating.

In 2012, Nishchay attended the National India Ice Skating Camp and competed in singles and pairs event, winning in both and represented India in Asian junior championship and secured first place. He started practicing in iSkate – an indoor ice skating rink in Gurgaon. In the year 2013, Nishchay placed third at the Asian figure skating championship held in Hong Kong and won 2 Silver medals at the National Ice Skating Championship in singles and pairs events.

Nishchay represented India at the World Development Trophy 2014 in Manila, Philippines and placed third in the novice category. In 2015, due to lack of training infrastructure, he moved to the United States for 6 months. Due to lack of money, he returned to India in December 2015. He won 2 gold medals in the National Indian Ice Skating Championship in 2016.

Nishchay aimed to represent India at the 2018 Winter Olympics in PyeongChang, South Korea, but was not able to qualify for the qualifying competition, 2017 Worlds.

In 2018 Nishchay moved to Dallas, Texas to train as a pair skater with the skater Hilary Asher under the coaching of Darlene Cain, Peter Cain, and Daniil Barantsev. After some months of rigorous training, Asher and Luthra signed up to compete at the Junior Grand Prix and other competitions representing India.

At the beginning of the competitive season, 2017-18 Luthra broke his right knee in a practice session, which led him to withdraw from the upcoming competitions and made him fly back to his home country. he was diagnosed with a severe lateral meniscus tear on his right knee.

During the recovery period, he started his own skating academy LIFSA (Luthra international figure skating academy) which aimed to develop figure skating as a sport in India. He was the national coach of season 2017-18 and 2018-19 and has helped many aspiring skaters. Luthra's students have been placed both nationally and internationally.

== Achievements ==
	Gold	Silver	Bronze
National	9	3	0
International	1	1	2

International Participations –

- Asian Junior Figure Skating Challenge 2012-13 – Hong Kong
- Asian Junior Figure Skating Challenge 2013-14 – Hong Kong
- ISU World Development Trophy 2014 – Manila, Philippines
- Labour Day Competition 2016 – Florida, USA

National Level Achievements –

- 2011- 7th Ice Skating Nationals, Shimla, India - 1 Gold
- 2012- 8th Ice Skating Nationals, Shimla, India - 2 Gold
- 2013- 9th Ice Skating Nationals, Shimla, India - 2 Silver
- 2014- 10th Ice Skating, Shimla, India - 2 Gold
- 2015 - 11th Ice Skating Nationals, Gurgaon, India - 2 Gold
- 2016 - 12 Ice Skating Nationals, Gulmarg, India - 2 Gold and 1 Silver
