= Kabaddi at the 2018 Asian Games – Women's tournament =

Women at the 2018 Asian Games
- Venue: Garuda Theatre
- Date: 19–24 August 2018
- Competitors: 105 from 9 nations

Medalists
| gold medal | Iran |
| silver medal | India |
| bronze medal | Chinese Taipei |
| bronze medal | Thailand |

Women's Kabaddi at the 2018 Asian Games was held in Garuda Theatre, Taman Mini Indonesia Indah, Jakarta, Indonesia from 19 to 24 August 2018.

== Squads ==
| Bangladesh | Chinese Taipei | India | Indonesia |
|---|---|---|---|
| Shahnaz Parvin Maleka; Rupali Akhter; Sharmin Sultana Rima; Shila Akhter; Fatema Akhter Poly; Hafiza Akther; Srity Khatun; Kochi Rani Mondal; Kohinur Begum; Sraboni Mollick; Rekha Akhteri; Disha Moni Sorker | Lin I-min; Lin Yu-fen; Chuang Ya-han; Huang Ssu-chin; Yen Chiao-wen; Chen Yung-ting; Hu Yu-chen; Feng Hsiu-chen; Qin Pei-jyun; Huang Yi-yun; Liao Yu-tzu; Wu Yu-jung | Sakshi Kumari; Kavita Thakur; Shalini Pathak; Randeep Kaur Khehra; Payel Chowdhury; Sonali Vishnu Shingate; Priyanka Negi; Ritu Negi; Sayali Sanjay Keripale; Usha Rani Narasimhaiah; Manpreet Kaur; Madhu | Komang Ariningsih; Ni Kadek Amiariasti; Ni Putu Dewi Laraswati; Ni Kadek Ernawati; Desak Gede Indah Vinda D; I Gusti Anak Agung Pradnyawati; Ni Komang Isna Pratiwi; Ni Ketut Puspasari; Agustina Siregar; Kadek Candra Wahyuni; Kadek Surya Febriantari; Ni Made Praarthini Samitha |
| Iran | Japan | South Korea | Sri Lanka |
| Ghazal Khalaj; Mahboubeh Sanchouli; Farideh Zarifdoust; Saeideh Jafari; Raheleh Naderi; Roya Davoudian; Samira Atarodian; Fatemeh Karami; Azadeh Seidi; Sedigheh Jafari; Zahra Karimi; Zahra Abbasi | Yoko Ota; Eri Kasahara; Miho Echizenya; Yumi Kaneko; Minami Ito; Yukiko Hayafuji; Mayuko Ito; Haru Inoue; Serina Takahashi; Chiharu Midorikawa | Kim Ji-young; Kim Hee-jeong; Lee Hyun-jeong; Shin So-min; Pak Min-kyung; Park Ji-yi; Woo Hee-jun; Im Jae-won; Jo Hyun-a; Yoon Yu-ri; Hong Hye-min | Kokila Edirisinghe; Thilakshi Wijethilaka; Indiwari Wejethunga; Madushani Chathurika; Madurika Hansamali; Methusala Thilakshani; Gothami Kaushalya; Sithumini Manojini; Sajini Jayasinghe; Nimesha Dilrukshi; Thilini Kanchana; Indika Damyanthi |
| Thailand | | | |
| Alisa Limsamran; Namfon Kangkeeree; Nuntarat Nuntakitkoson; Kamontip Suwanchana; Wassana Rachmanee; Saowapa Chueakhao; Atchara Puangngern; Charinda Yindee; Panthida Khamthat; Kannika Munmai; Bencharat Khwanchai; Naleerat Ketsaro | | | |

== Results ==
All times are Western Indonesia Time (UTC+07:00)

=== Preliminary round ===
==== Group A ====
| Pos | Team | Pld | W | D | L | PF | PA | PD | Pts | Qualification |
|---|---|---|---|---|---|---|---|---|---|---|
| 1 | India | 4 | 4 | 0 | 0 | 168 | 69 | +99 | 8 | Semifinals |
| 2 | Thailand | 4 | 3 | 0 | 1 | 142 | 75 | +67 | 6 | Semifinals |
| 3 | Sri Lanka | 4 | 2 | 0 | 2 | 83 | 113 | −30 | 4 | |
| 4 | Indonesia | 4 | 1 | 0 | 3 | 84 | 145 | −61 | 2 | |
| 5 | Japan | 4 | 0 | 0 | 4 | 63 | 138 | −75 | 0 | |

Source: OCA

19 August
9:00

| India | 43–12 (HT: 19–8) | Japan |

Garuda Theatre, Jakarta

19 August
10:40

| Sri Lanka | 15–41 (HT: 7–24) | Thailand |

Garuda Theatre, Jakarta

19 August
12:20

| Indonesia | 30–22 (HT: 18–9) | Japan |

Garuda Theatre, Jakarta

20 August
9:00

| Indonesia | 17–34 (HT: 6–17) | Sri Lanka |

Garuda Theatre, Jakarta

20 August
10:40

| India | 33–23 (HT: 12–10) | Thailand |

Garuda Theatre, Jakarta

20 August
12:20

| Japan | 17–22 (HT: 10–8) | Sri Lanka |

Garuda Theatre, Jakarta

21 August
9:00

| India | 38–12 (HT: 23–4) | Sri Lanka |

Garuda Theatre, Jakarta

21 August
10:40

| Japan | 12–43 (HT: 4–28) | Thailand |

Garuda Theatre, Jakarta

21 August
12:20

| India | 54–22 (HT: 28–10) | Indonesia |

Garuda Theatre, Jakarta

23 August
11:00

| Indonesia | 15–35 (HT: 6–18) | Thailand |

Garuda Theatre, Jakarta

==== Group B ====
| Pos | Team | Pld | W | D | L | PF | PA | PD | Pts | Qualification |
|---|---|---|---|---|---|---|---|---|---|---|
| 1 | Iran | 3 | 2 | 0 | 1 | 111 | 61 | +50 | 4 (Note: Match points difference against the teams which scored 25% or more of the league points: IRI +22, TPE 0, KOR −22.) | Semifinals |
| 2 | Chinese Taipei | 3 | 2 | 0 | 1 | 81 | 66 | +15 | 4 | Semifinals |
| 3 | South Korea | 3 | 2 | 0 | 1 | 92 | 87 | +5 | 4 | |
| 4 | Bangladesh | 3 | 0 | 0 | 3 | 72 | 142 | −70 | 0 | |

Source: OCA
Notes:

19 August
9:50

| Iran | 46–20 (HT: 23–9) | South Korea |

Garuda Theatre, Jakarta

19 August
11:30

| Bangladesh | 28–43 (HT: 16–23) | Chinese Taipei |

Garuda Theatre, Jakarta

20 August
9:50

| Chinese Taipei | 16–20 (HT: 7–8) | South Korea |

Garuda Theatre, Jakarta

20 August
11:30

| Bangladesh | 19–47 (HT: 8–25) | Iran |

Garuda Theatre, Jakarta

21 August
9:50

| Chinese Taipei | 22–18 (HT: 14–9) | Iran |

Garuda Theatre, Jakarta

21 August
11:30

| Bangladesh | 25–52 (HT: 11–20) | South Korea |

Garuda Theatre, Jakarta

=== Knockout round ===
Semifinals
23 August
India | 27
Chinese Taipei | 14
23 August
Iran | 23
Thailand | 16

Gold medal match
24 August
India | 24
Iran | 27

==== Semifinals ====
23 August
15:00

| India | 27–14 (HT: 11–8) | Chinese Taipei |

Garuda Theatre, Jakarta

23 August
15:50

| Iran | 23–16 (HT: 17–8) | Thailand |

Garuda Theatre, Jakarta

==== Gold medal match ====
24 August
15:00

| India | 24–27 (HT: 13–11) | Iran |

Garuda Theatre, Jakarta

== Final standing ==
| Rank | Team | Pld | W | D | L |
|---|---|---|---|---|---|
| 1st place, gold medalist(s) | Iran | 5 | 4 | 0 | 1 |
| 2nd place, silver medalist(s) | India | 6 | 5 | 0 | 1 |
| 3rd place, bronze medalist(s) | Chinese Taipei | 4 | 2 | 0 | 2 |
| 3rd place, bronze medalist(s) | Thailand | 5 | 3 | 0 | 2 |
| 5 | South Korea | 3 | 2 | 0 | 1 |
| 5 | Sri Lanka | 4 | 2 | 0 | 2 |
| 7 | Bangladesh | 3 | 0 | 0 | 3 |
| 7 | Indonesia | 4 | 1 | 0 | 3 |
| 9 | Japan | 4 | 0 | 0 | 4 |
