= Kabaddi at the 2018 Asian Games =

Asian Games competition

- Venue: Garuda Theatre
- Dates: 19–24 August 2018
- Competitors: 235 from 12 nations

Kabaddi at the 2018 Asian Games was held at the Garuda Theatre, Taman Mini Indonesia Indah, Jakarta, Indonesia, from 19 to 24 August 2018.

== Schedule ==
P	Preliminary round	½	Semifinals	F	Final

Event↓/Date →	19th Sun	20th Mon	21st Tue	22nd Wed	23rd Thu		24th Fri
Men	P	P	P	P	P	½	F
Women	P	P	P		P	½	F

== Medalists ==
Event	Gold	Silver	Bronze
Men	Iran; Fazel Atrachali; Mohammad Esmaeil Nabibakhsh; Mohammad Amin Nosrati; Hadi Oshtorak; Mohammad Mallak; Mohammad Ghorbani; Esmaeil Maghsoudloo; Meisam Abbasi; Mohsen Maghsoudloo; Abouzar Mohajer; Abolfazl Maghsoudloo; Hamid Mirzaei	South Korea; Lee Dong-geon; Eom Tae-deok; Ok Yong-joo; Lee Jang-kun; Hong Dong-ju; Kim Dong-gyu; Park Chan-sik; Jo Jae-pil; Kim Seong-ryeol; Park Hyun-il; Kim Gyung-tae; Ko Young-chang	Pakistan; Nasir Ali; Waseem Sajjad; Muhammad Nadeem; Muhammad Rizwan; Abid Hussain; Waqar Ali; Tahseen Ullah; Usman Zada; Mudassar Ali; Kashif Razzaq; Muhammad Imran; Hassan Raza
Men	Iran; Fazel Atrachali; Mohammad Esmaeil Nabibakhsh; Mohammad Amin Nosrati; Hadi Oshtorak; Mohammad Mallak; Mohammad Ghorbani; Esmaeil Maghsoudloo; Meisam Abbasi; Mohsen Maghsoudloo; Abouzar Mohajer; Abolfazl Maghsoudloo; Hamid Mirzaei	South Korea; Lee Dong-geon; Eom Tae-deok; Ok Yong-joo; Lee Jang-kun; Hong Dong-ju; Kim Dong-gyu; Park Chan-sik; Jo Jae-pil; Kim Seong-ryeol; Park Hyun-il; Kim Gyung-tae; Ko Young-chang	India; Monu Goyat; Rahul Chaudhari; Mohit Chhillar; Ajay Thakur; Girish Maruti Ernak; Pardeep Narwal; Sandeep Narwal; Raju Lal Choudhary; Rishank Devadiga; Rohit Kumar; Deepak Niwas Hooda; Gangadhari Mallesh
Women	Iran; Ghazal Khalaj; Mahboubeh Sanchouli; Farideh Zarifdoust; Saeideh Jafari; Raheleh Naderi; Roya Davoudian; Samira Atarodian; Fatemeh Karami; Azadeh Seidi; Sedigheh Jafari; Zahra Karimi; Zahra Abbasi	India; Sakshi Kumari; Kavita Thakur; Shalini Pathak; Randeep Kaur Khehra; Payel Chowdhury; Sonali Vishnu Shingate; Priyanka Negi; Ritu Negi; Sayali Sanjay Keripale; Usha Rani Narasimhaiah; Manpreet Kaur; Madhu	Chinese Taipei; Lin I-min; Lin Yu-fen; Chuang Ya-han; Huang Ssu-chin; Yen Chiao-wen; Chen Yung-ting; Hu Yu-chen; Feng Hsiu-chen; Qin Pei-jyun; Huang Yi-yun; Liao Yu-tzu; Wu Yu-jung
Women	Iran; Ghazal Khalaj; Mahboubeh Sanchouli; Farideh Zarifdoust; Saeideh Jafari; Raheleh Naderi; Roya Davoudian; Samira Atarodian; Fatemeh Karami; Azadeh Seidi; Sedigheh Jafari; Zahra Karimi; Zahra Abbasi	India; Sakshi Kumari; Kavita Thakur; Shalini Pathak; Randeep Kaur Khehra; Payel Chowdhury; Sonali Vishnu Shingate; Priyanka Negi; Ritu Negi; Sayali Sanjay Keripale; Usha Rani Narasimhaiah; Manpreet Kaur; Madhu	Thailand; Alisa Limsamran; Namfon Kangkeeree; Nuntarat Nuntakitkoson; Kamontip Suwanchana; Wassana Rachmanee; Saowapa Chueakhao; Atchara Puangngern; Charinda Yindee; Panthida Khamthat; Kannika Munmai; Bencharat Khwanchai; Naleerat Ketsaro

== Medal table ==
Rank	Nation	Gold	Silver	Bronze	Total
1	Iran (IRI)	2	0	0	2
2	India (IND)	0	1	1	2
3	South Korea (KOR)	0	1	0	1
4	Chinese Taipei (TPE)	0	0	1	1
4	Pakistan (PAK)	0	0	1	1
4	Thailand (THA)	0	0	1	1
Totals (6 entries)		2	2	4	8

== Draw ==
A draw ceremony was held on 17 August 2018 to determine the groups for the men's and women's competitions. The teams were seeded based on their final ranking at the 2014 Asian Games.

=== Men ===
Group A

- India (1)
- South Korea (3)
- Bangladesh
- Thailand
- Sri Lanka

Group B

- Iran (2)
- Pakistan (3)
- Japan
- Nepal
- Malaysia
- Indonesia

=== Women ===
Group A

- India (1)
- Thailand (3)
- Japan
- Sri Lanka
- Indonesia

Group B

- Iran (2)
- Bangladesh (3)
- South Korea
- Chinese Taipei

== Final standing ==
=== Men ===
Rank	Team	Pld	W	D	L
1st place, gold medalist(s)	Iran	7	7	0	0
2nd place, silver medalist(s)	South Korea	6	5	0	1
3rd place, bronze medalist(s)	India	5	3	0	2
3rd place, bronze medalist(s)	Pakistan	6	4	0	2
5	Bangladesh	4	2	0	2
5	Indonesia	5	3	0	2
7	Japan	5	2	0	3
7	Sri Lanka	4	1	0	3
9	Nepal	5	1	0	4
9	Thailand	4	0	0	4
11	Malaysia	5	0	0	5

=== Women ===
Rank	Team	Pld	W	D	L
1st place, gold medalist(s)	Iran	5	4	0	1
2nd place, silver medalist(s)	India	6	5	0	1
3rd place, bronze medalist(s)	Chinese Taipei	4	2	0	2
3rd place, bronze medalist(s)	Thailand	5	3	0	2
5	South Korea	3	2	0	1
5	Sri Lanka	4	2	0	2
7	Bangladesh	3	0	0	3
7	Indonesia	4	1	0	3
9	Japan	4	0	0	4
