= Beach kabaddi at the 2016 Asian Beach Games =

- Venue: Biển Đông Park
- Dates: 23–27 September 2016

Beach kabaddi competition at the 2016 Asian Beach Games was held in Danang, Vietnam from 23 to 27 September 2016 at Bien Dong Park, Danang, Vietnam.

== Medalists ==
Event	Gold	Silver	Bronze
Men	Pakistan; Nasir Ali; Akhlaq Hussain; Muhammad Imran; Kashif Razzaq; Arslan Ahmed; Ibrar Hussain	India; Sandeep Narwal; Middina Nagaraju; Suresh Reddy Bogi; Rajesh Mondal; Manoj Kumar Chandana; Surjeet Singh Narwal	Sri Lanka; Milinda Chathuranga; Ruwan Samarakoon; Lahiru Kuruppu; Kasun Thenuwara; Ranidu Chamara; Rathnayake Mudiyanselage
Men	Pakistan; Nasir Ali; Akhlaq Hussain; Muhammad Imran; Kashif Razzaq; Arslan Ahmed; Ibrar Hussain	India; Sandeep Narwal; Middina Nagaraju; Suresh Reddy Bogi; Rajesh Mondal; Manoj Kumar Chandana; Surjeet Singh Narwal	South Korea; Lee Dong-geon; Eom Tae-deok; Lee Jang-kun; Hong Dong-ju; Kim Seong-ryeol; Kim Tae-beom
Women	India; Payel Chowdhury; Sakshi Kumari; Anthoniyammal Savarimuthu; Gayatri Karampudi; Pinki; Vara Manikya Durga Kodela	Thailand; Tanatporn Srijan; Thanwarat Chongmi; Krittaya Kwangkunthot; Siwita Pongmak; Jeerawan Namchiangtai; Yamonporn Arunrat	Sri Lanka; Sajini Jayasinghe; Madavi Wijekoon; Manoja Lakmali; Madushani Chathurika; Madurika Hansamali; Methusala Thilakshani
Women	India; Payel Chowdhury; Sakshi Kumari; Anthoniyammal Savarimuthu; Gayatri Karampudi; Pinki; Vara Manikya Durga Kodela	Thailand; Tanatporn Srijan; Thanwarat Chongmi; Krittaya Kwangkunthot; Siwita Pongmak; Jeerawan Namchiangtai; Yamonporn Arunrat	South Korea; Jo Hyun-a; Ko Eun-byeol; Shin So-min; Kim Hee-jeong; Yoon Yu-ri; Kim Ji-young

== Medal table ==
Rank	Nation	Gold	Silver	Bronze	Total
1	India (IND)	1	1	0	2
2	Pakistan (PAK)	1	0	0	1
3	Thailand (THA)	0	1	0	1
4	South Korea (KOR)	0	0	2	2
4	Sri Lanka (SRI)	0	0	2	2
Totals (5 entries)		2	2	4	8

== Results ==
=== Men ===
==== Preliminary ====
===== Group A =====
Pos	Team	Pld	W	D	L	PF	PA	PD	Pts
1	India	2	1	1	0	83	61	+22	3
2	Pakistan	2	1	1	0	78	70	+8	3
3	Thailand	2	0	0	2	69	99	−30	0

Source: OCA

23 September
15:00

Pakistan	47–39 (HT: 25–22)	Thailand

Biển Đông Park, Da Nang

24 September
8:00

India	52–30 (HT: 30–13)	Thailand

Biển Đông Park, Da Nang

25 September
15:00

Pakistan	31–31 (HT: 15–18)	India

Biển Đông Park, Da Nang

===== Group B =====
Pos	Team	Pld	W	D	L	PF	PA	PD	Pts
1	South Korea	2	2	0	0	100	57	+43	4
2	Sri Lanka	2	1	0	1	114	60	+54	2
3	Malaysia	2	0	0	2	39	136	−97	0

Source: OCA

23 September
16:00

South Korea	60–19 (HT: 27–8)	Malaysia

Biển Đông Park, Da Nang

24 September
9:00

Sri Lanka	76–20 (HT: 33–13)	Malaysia

Biển Đông Park, Da Nang

25 September
16:00

Sri Lanka	38–40 (HT: 21–19)	South Korea

Biển Đông Park, Da Nang

==== Knockout round ====
Semifinals
26 September
India	49
Sri Lanka	26
26 September
South Korea	31
Pakistan	35

Gold medal match
27 September
India	28
Pakistan	30

===== Semifinals =====
26 September
15:00

India	49–26 (HT: 26–12)	Sri Lanka

Biển Đông Park, Da Nang

26 September
16:00

South Korea	31–35 (HT: 15–17)	Pakistan

Biển Đông Park, Da Nang

===== Gold medal match =====
27 September
16:00

India	28–30 (HT: 11–16)	Pakistan

Biển Đông Park, Da Nang

=== Women ===
==== Preliminary ====
===== Group A =====
Pos	Team	Pld	W	D	L	PF	PA	PD	Pts
1	India	2	2	0	0	94	68	+26	4
2	South Korea	2	1	0	1	104	72	+32	2
3	Vietnam	2	0	0	2	54	112	−58	0

Source: OCA

23 September
8:00

India	45–41 (HT: 21–21)	South Korea

Biển Đông Park, Da Nang

25 September
9:00

South Korea	63–27 (HT: 31–17)	Vietnam

Biển Đông Park, Da Nang

26 September
8:00

India	49–27 (HT: 30–8)	Vietnam

Biển Đông Park, Da Nang

===== Group B =====
Pos	Team	Pld	W	D	L	PF	PA	PD	Pts
1	Thailand	2	2	0	0	99	69	+30	4
2	Sri Lanka	2	1	0	1	85	76	+9	2
3	Bangladesh	2	0	0	2	57	96	−39	0

Source: OCA

23 September
9:00

Thailand	52–28 (HT: 31–13)	Bangladesh

Biển Đông Park, Da Nang

25 September
8:00

Thailand	47–41 (HT: 24–20)	Sri Lanka

Biển Đông Park, Da Nang

26 September
9:00

Sri Lanka	44–29 (HT: 28–12)	Bangladesh

Biển Đông Park, Da Nang

==== Knockout round ====
Semifinals
27 September
India	39
Sri Lanka	23
27 September
Thailand	40
South Korea	33

Gold medal match
27 September
India	41
Thailand	31

===== Semifinals =====
27 September
8:00

India	39–23 (HT: 22–11)	Sri Lanka

Biển Đông Park, Da Nang

27 September
9:00

Thailand	40–33 (HT: 20–20)	South Korea

Biển Đông Park, Da Nang

===== Gold medal match =====
27 September
15:00

India	41–31 (HT: 18–17)	Thailand

Biển Đông Park, Da Nang
