= Beach kabaddi at the 2014 Asian Beach Games =

- Venue: Patong Beach
- Dates: 19–23 November 2014

Beach kabaddi competition at the 2014 Asian Beach Games was held in Phuket, Thailand from 19 to 23 November 2014 at Patong Beach, Phuket.

== Medalists ==
Event	Gold	Silver	Bronze
Men	Iran; Abouzar Mohajer; Mohsen Maghsoudloo; Mohammad Taghi Paeinmahalli; Meraj Sheikh; Hadi Oshtorak; Amir Hossein Mohammadmaleki	Pakistan; Nasir Ali; Akhlaq Hussain; Muhammad Tariq; Usman Zada; Waseem Sajjad; Ibrar Hussain	Sri Lanka; Milinda Chathuranga; Ruwan Samarakoon; Sinotharan Kanesharajah; Ranidu Chamara; Kapila Bandara; Susantha Koralage
Men	Iran; Abouzar Mohajer; Mohsen Maghsoudloo; Mohammad Taghi Paeinmahalli; Meraj Sheikh; Hadi Oshtorak; Amir Hossein Mohammadmaleki	Pakistan; Nasir Ali; Akhlaq Hussain; Muhammad Tariq; Usman Zada; Waseem Sajjad; Ibrar Hussain	India; Kashiling Adake; Mahesh Goud; Rahul Chaudhari; Rajesh Narwal; Rishank Devadiga; Sukesh Hegde
Women	India; Mamatha Poojary; Priyanka; Randeep Kaur Khehra; Kakoli Biswas; Payel Chowdhury; Parameswari Ambalavanan	Thailand; Tanatporn Srijan; Jirawan Jareonroop; Krittaya Kwangkunthot; Siwita Pongmak; Jeerawan Namchiangtai; Pawittra Sakulmak	South Korea; Jo Hyun-a; Kim Ji-young; Kim Hee-jeong; Yoon Yu-ri; Lee Hyun-jeong; Im Jae-won
Women	India; Mamatha Poojary; Priyanka; Randeep Kaur Khehra; Kakoli Biswas; Payel Chowdhury; Parameswari Ambalavanan	Thailand; Tanatporn Srijan; Jirawan Jareonroop; Krittaya Kwangkunthot; Siwita Pongmak; Jeerawan Namchiangtai; Pawittra Sakulmak	Sri Lanka; Kokila Edirisinghe; Thilakshi Wijethilaka; Hansika Deepthi; Madushani Chathurika; Dilini Wirapperuma; Madurika Hansamali

== Medal table ==
Rank	Nation	Gold	Silver	Bronze	Total
1	India (IND)	1	0	1	2
2	Iran (IRI)	1	0	0	1
3	Pakistan (PAK)	0	1	0	1
3	Thailand (THA)	0	1	0	1
5	Sri Lanka (SRI)	0	0	2	2
6	South Korea (KOR)	0	0	1	1
Totals (6 entries)		2	2	4	8

== Results ==
=== Men ===
==== Preliminary round ====
===== Group A =====
Pos	Team	Pld	W	D	L	PF	PA	PD	Pts
1	Iran	3	3	0	0	132	91	+41	6
2	India	3	2	0	1	125	108	+17	4
3	Bangladesh	3	1	0	2	112	124	−12	2
4	Thailand	3	0	0	3	103	149	−46	0

Source: OCA

19 November
14:00

Iran	45–32 (HT: 29–12)	Bangladesh

Patong Beach, Phuket

19 November
15:20

Thailand	42–48 (HT: 17–29)	India

Patong Beach, Phuket

20 November
14:00

India	31–40 (HT: 16–18)	Iran

Patong Beach, Phuket

20 November
15:20

Thailand	33–54 (HT: 14–29)	Bangladesh

Patong Beach, Phuket

21 November
14:00

Iran	47–28 (HT: 26–11)	Thailand

Patong Beach, Phuket

21 November
15:20

India	46–26 (HT: 20–14)	Bangladesh

Patong Beach, Phuket

===== Group B =====
Pos	Team	Pld	W	D	L	PF	PA	PD	Pts
1	Pakistan	3	2	1	0	113	95	+18	5
2	Sri Lanka	3	2	0	1	116	121	−5	4
3	South Korea	3	1	1	1	121	119	+2	3
4	Oman	3	0	0	3	121	136	−15	0

Source: OCA

19 November
14:40

Pakistan	42–33 (HT: 17–21)	Oman

Patong Beach, Phuket

19 November
16:00

Sri Lanka	41–40 (HT: 24–17)	South Korea

Patong Beach, Phuket

20 November
14:40

Pakistan	37–28 (HT: 17–15)	Sri Lanka

Patong Beach, Phuket

20 November
16:00

South Korea	47–44 (HT: 21–25)	Oman

Patong Beach, Phuket

21 November
14:40

Sri Lanka	47–44 (HT: 25–21)	Oman

Patong Beach, Phuket

21 November
16:00

Pakistan	34–34 (HT: 15–19)	South Korea

Patong Beach, Phuket

==== Knockout round ====
Semifinals
22 November
Iran	45
Sri Lanka	34
22 November
Pakistan	39
India	28

Gold medal match
23 November
Iran	40
Pakistan	27

===== Semifinals =====
22 November
14:00

Iran	45–34 (HT: 23–16)	Sri Lanka

Patong Beach, Phuket

22 November
15:00

Pakistan	39–28 (HT: 18–16)	India

Patong Beach, Phuket

===== Gold medal match =====
23 November
10:30

Iran	40–27 (HT: 21–14)	Pakistan

Patong Beach, Phuket

=== Women ===
==== Preliminary round ====
Pos	Team	Pld	W	D	L	PF	PA	PD	Pts
1	India	4	4	0	0	238	109	+129	8
2	Thailand	4	3	0	1	188	180	+8	6
3	South Korea	4	2	0	2	163	194	−31	4
4	Sri Lanka	4	1	0	3	154	205	−51	2
5	Bangladesh	4	0	0	4	133	188	−55	0

Source: OCA

19 November
16:40

Thailand	56–42 (HT: 35–23)	Sri Lanka

Patong Beach, Phuket

19 November
17:20

India	64–28 (HT: 31–16)	South Korea

Patong Beach, Phuket

20 November
16:40

Sri Lanka	40–50 (HT: 22–25)	South Korea

Patong Beach, Phuket

20 November
17:20

Thailand	55–29 (HT: 26–17)	Bangladesh

Patong Beach, Phuket

21 November
16:40

India	59–30 (HT: 32–14)	Sri Lanka

Patong Beach, Phuket

21 November
17:20

Bangladesh	40–41 (HT: 17–20)	South Korea

Patong Beach, Phuket

22 November
9:30

India	50–24 (HT: 29–10)	Bangladesh

Patong Beach, Phuket

22 November
10:30

Thailand	50–44 (HT: 28–25)	South Korea

Patong Beach, Phuket

22 November
16:00

India	65–27 (HT: 33–14)	Thailand

Patong Beach, Phuket

22 November
17:00

Sri Lanka	42–40 (HT: 22–20)	Bangladesh

Patong Beach, Phuket

==== Gold medal match ====
23 November
9:30

India	61–28 (HT: 34–13)	Thailand

Patong Beach, Phuket
