= Beach kabaddi at the Asian Beach Games =

- Sport: Kabaddi
- Founded: 2008; 18 years ago
- First season: 2008
- Administrator: Olympic Council of Asia
- Region: Asia
- Most recent champions: M: Iran (3rd title); W: India (6th title)
- Most titles: M: Iran (3 titlesh); W: India (6 titles)

The Beach kabaddi at the Asian Beach Games is a Beach kabaddi competition of the Asian Beach Games. It was first held in 2008.

== Summary ==
=== Men ===
#	Year	Host	Final			Bronze medalists		Teams
#	Year	Host	Winner	Score	Runner-up	Bronze medalists		Teams
1	2008	(Indonesia); Bali	India	37–32	Pakistan	Bangladesh	Thailand	6
2	2010	(Oman); Muscat	India	32–27	Pakistan	Iran	Oman	10
3	2012	(China); Haiyang	Iran	39–33	Pakistan	Sri Lanka	India	7
4	2014	(Thailand); Phuket	Iran	40–27	Pakistan	Sri Lanka	India	8
5	2016	(Vietnam); Da Nang	Pakistan	30–28	India	Sri Lanka	South Korea	6
6	2026	(China); Sanya	Iran	44–31	India	Sri Lanka	Pakistan	8

=== Women ===
#	Year	Host	Final			Bronze medalists		Teams
#	Year	Host	Winner	Score	Runner-up	Bronze medalists		Teams
1	2008	(Indonesia); Bali	India	65–38	Thailand	Indonesia	South Korea	5
2	2010	(Oman); Muscat	India	50–40	Thailand	Bangladesh	Indonesia	4
3	2012	(China); Haiyang	India	54–25	Thailand	Bangladesh	Sri Lanka	4
4	2014	(Thailand); Phuket	India	61–28	Thailand	South Korea	Sri Lanka	5
5	2016	(Vietnam); Da Nang	India	41–31	Thailand	Sri Lanka	South Korea	6
6	2026	(China); Sanya	India	47–31	Sri Lanka	Bangladesh	Nepal	7

== Medal table ==
=== Total ===
Rank	Nation	Gold	Silver	Bronze	Total
1	India (IND)	8	2	2	12
2	Iran (IRI)	3	0	1	4
3	Pakistan (PAK)	1	4	1	6
4	Thailand (THA)	0	5	1	6
5	Sri Lanka (SRI)	0	1	7	8
6	Bangladesh (BAN)	0	0	4	4
6	South Korea (KOR)	0	0	4	4
8	Indonesia (INA)	0	0	2	2
9	Nepal (NEP)	0	0	1	1
9	Oman (OMA)	0	0	1	1
Totals (10 entries)		12	12	24	48

=== Men ===
Rank	Nation	Gold	Silver	Bronze	Total
1	Iran (IRI)	3	0	1	4
2	India (IND)	2	2	2	6
3	Pakistan (PAK)	1	4	1	6
4	Sri Lanka (SRI)	0	0	4	4
5	Bangladesh (BAN)	0	0	1	1
5	Oman (OMA)	0	0	1	1
5	South Korea (KOR)	0	0	1	1
5	Thailand (THA)	0	0	1	1
Totals (8 entries)		6	6	12	24

=== Women ===
Rank	Nation	Gold	Silver	Bronze	Total
1	India (IND)	6	0	0	6
2	Thailand (THA)	0	5	0	5
3	Sri Lanka (SRI)	0	1	3	4
4	Bangladesh (BAN)	0	0	3	3
4	South Korea (KOR)	0	0	3	3
6	Indonesia (INA)	0	0	2	2
7	Nepal (NEP)	0	0	1	1
Totals (7 entries)		6	6	12	24

== Participating nations ==
=== Men ===
Team	(Indonesia) 2008	(Oman) 2010	(China) 2012	(Thailand) 2014	(Vietnam) 2016	(China) 2026	Years
Afghanistan		9th	7th				2
Bangladesh	3rd			5th		5th	3
Chinese Taipei						7th	1
India	1st	1st	3rd	3rd	2nd	2nd	6
Indonesia	5th	7th					2
Iran		3rd	1st	1st		1st	4
Malaysia					5th		1
Nepal		9th					1
Oman		3rd		7th			2
Pakistan	2nd	2nd	2nd	2nd	1st	3rd	6
South Korea	6th	7th	5th	5th	3rd		5
Sri Lanka		5th	3rd	3rd	3rd	3rd	5
Syria						7th	1
Thailand	3rd	5th	5th	7th	5th	5th	6
Teams (14)	6	10	7	8	6	8	_

=== Women ===
Team	(Indonesia) 2008	(Oman) 2010	(China) 2012	(Thailand) 2014	(Vietnam) 2016	(China) 2026	Years
Bangladesh		3rd	3rd	5th	5th	3rd	5
Chinese Taipei						7th	1
India	1st	1st	1st	1st	1st	1st	6
Indonesia	3rd	3rd					2
Malaysia	5th						1
Nepal						3rd	1
South Korea	3rd			3rd	3rd		3
Sri Lanka			3rd	3rd	3rd	2nd	4
Syria						5th	1
Thailand	2nd	2nd	2nd	2nd	2nd	5th	6
Vietnam					5th		1
Teams (11)	5	4	4	5	6	7	_
