= Ghazal Khalaj =

Iranian kabaddi player (born 1990)

Personal information
- Nationality: Iran
- Born: 22 September 1990 (age 35)
- Height: 170 cm (5 ft 7 in)

Sport
- Sport: Kabaddi
Medal record
Women's Kabaddi
Representing Iran
Asian Games
Gold medal – first place	2018 Jakarta Palembang	Team
Silver medal – second place	2014 Incheaon	Team
Bronze medal – third place	2022 Hangzhou	Team
Bronze medal – third place	2010 Guangzhou	Team

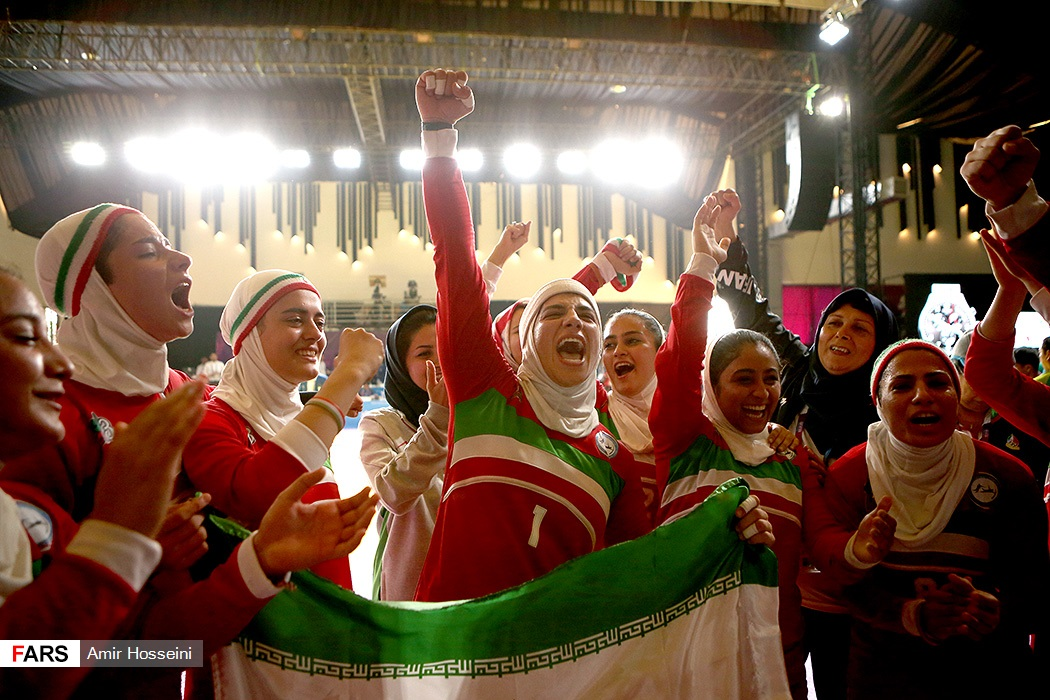
Ghazal Khalaj (center, wearing jersey numbered 1) celebrates with her teammates after winning the gold medal at the 2018 Asian Games

Ghazal Khalaj (born 22 September 1990) is an Iranian kabaddi player and captain of the Iranian national women's kabaddi team.

== Career ==
In 2018, she led the team to win a gold medal at the Asian games, beating India.

In 2022 Asian Games, she was part of the team that won bronze.
