= Kabaddi at the Asian Games =

- Governing bodies: IKF (World) / AKF (Asia)
- Events: 2 (men: 1; women: 1)

Games
- 1951; 1954; 1958; 1962; 1966; 1970; 1974; 1978; 1982; 1986; 1990; 1994; 1998; 2002; 2006; 2010; 2014; 2018; 2022; 2026
- Medalists

Kabaddi made its first appearance as an exhibition sport at the Asian Games in 1982. Men's kabaddi has been an Asian Games event since 1990, and women's kabaddi since 2010.

India has dominated the sport at the Asian Games, winning the gold medal in both men's and women's events at all editions except for 2018, when Iran won the gold medal in both events.

== Summary ==
=== Men ===
#	Year	Host	Final			Third place match			Teams
#	Year	Host	Winner	Score	Runner-up	3rd place	Score	4th place	Teams
1	1990	(China); Beijing	India	No playoffs	Bangladesh	Pakistan	No playoffs	China Japan Nepal	6
2	1994	(Japan); Hiroshima	India	No playoffs	Bangladesh	Pakistan	No playoffs	Japan	5
3	1998	(Thailand); Bangkok	India	No playoffs	Pakistan	Bangladesh	No playoffs	Sri Lanka	7
4	2002	(South Korea); Busan	India	No playoffs	Bangladesh	Pakistan	No playoffs	Japan	6
5	2006	(Qatar); Doha	India	35–23	Pakistan	Bangladesh	37–26	Iran	5
#	Year	Host	Final			Bronze medalists			Teams
#	Year	Host	Winner	Score	Runner-up	Bronze medalists			Teams
6	2010	(China); Guangzhou	India	37–20	Iran	Pakistan	and	Japan	7
7	2014	(South Korea); Incheon	India	27–25	Iran	Pakistan	and	South Korea	8
8	2018	(Indonesia); Jakarta–Palembang	Iran	26–16	South Korea	Pakistan	and	India	11
9	2022	(China); Hangzhou	India	33–29	Iran	Pakistan	and	Chinese Taipei	9
10	2026	(Japan); Nagoya	India	40–34	Iran	Thailand	and	Chinese Taipei	10

=== Women ===
#	Year	Host	Final			Bronze medalists			Teams
#	Year	Host	Winner	Score	Runner-up	Bronze medalists			Teams
1	2010	(China); Guangzhou	India	28–14	Thailand	Iran	and	Bangladesh	8
2	2014	(South Korea); Incheon	India	31–21	Iran	Thailand	and	Bangladesh	7
3	2018	(Indonesia); Jakarta–Palembang	Iran	27–24	India	Thailand	and	Chinese Taipei	9
4	2022	(China); Hangzhou	India	26–25	Chinese Taipei	Iran	and	Nepal	7
5	2026	(Japan); Nagoya	India	37–34	Iran	Chinese Taipei	and	Nepal	8

== Medal table ==
=== Total ===
Rank	Nation	Gold	Silver	Bronze	Total
1	India (IND)	13	1	1	15
2	Iran (IRI)	2	6	2	10
3	Bangladesh (BAN)	0	3	4	7
4	Pakistan (PAK)	0	2	7	9
5	Chinese Taipei (TPE)	0	1	4	5
6	Thailand (THA)	0	1	3	4
7	South Korea (KOR)	0	1	1	2
8	Nepal (NEP)	0	0	2	2
9	Japan (JPN)	0	0	1	1
Totals (9 entries)		15	15	25	55

=== Men ===
Rank	Nation	Gold	Silver	Bronze	Total
1	India (IND)	9	0	1	10
2	Iran (IRI)	1	4	0	5
3	Bangladesh (BAN)	0	3	2	5
4	Pakistan (PAK)	0	2	7	9
5	South Korea (KOR)	0	1	1	2
6	Chinese Taipei (TPE)	0	0	2	2
7	Japan (JPN)	0	0	1	1
7	Thailand (THA)	0	0	1	1
Totals (8 entries)		10	10	15	35

=== Women ===
Rank	Nation	Gold	Silver	Bronze	Total
1	India (IND)	4	1	0	5
2	Iran (IRI)	1	2	2	5
3	Chinese Taipei (TPE)	0	1	2	3
3	Thailand (THA)	0	1	2	3
5	Bangladesh (BAN)	0	0	2	2
5	Nepal (NEP)	0	0	2	2
Totals (6 entries)		5	5	10	20

== Participating nations ==
=== Men ===
Team	(China) 1990	(Japan) 1994	(Thailand) 1998	(South Korea) 2002	(Qatar) 2006	(China) 2010	(South Korea) 2014	(Indonesia) 2018	(China) 2022	(Japan) 2026	Years
Bangladesh	2nd	2nd	3rd	2nd	3rd	5th	7th	5th	5th	7th	10
China	4th										1
India	1st	1st	1st	1st	1st	1st	1st	3rd	1st	1st	10
Indonesia								5th			1
Iran					4th	2nd	2nd	1st	2nd	2nd	6
Japan	4th	4th	5th	4th	5th	3rd	7th	7th	9th	6th	10
South Korea						5th	3rd	2nd	7th	9th	5
Malaysia				5th		7th	5th	11th	5th	10th	6
Nepal	4th	5th	7th					9th		8th	5
Pakistan	3rd	3rd	2nd	3rd	2nd	3rd	3rd	3rd	3rd	5th	10
Sri Lanka			4th	6th				7th			3
Chinese Taipei									3rd	3rd	2
Thailand			6th				5th	9th	7th	3rd	5
Teams (13)	6	5	7	6	5	7	8	11	9	10	–

=== Women ===
Team	(China) 2010	(South Korea) 2014	(Indonesia) 2018	(China) 2022	(Japan) 2026	Years
Bangladesh	3rd	3rd	7th	5th	6th	5
India	1st	1st	2nd	1st	1st	5
Indonesia			7th			1
Iran	3rd	2nd	1st	3rd	2nd	5
Japan		5th	9th		8th	3
South Korea	5th	5th	5th	7th		4
Malaysia	7th					1
Nepal	7th			3rd	3rd	3
Sri Lanka			5th		7th	2
Chinese Taipei	5th	7th	3rd	2nd	3rd	5
Thailand	2nd	3rd	3rd	5th	5th	5
Teams (11)	8	7	9	7	8	–

== See also ==
- Beach kabaddi at the Asian Beach Games
