= 2012 Women's Kabaddi World Cup (International Kabaddi Federation) =

International kabaddi tournament in India

Tournament information
- Dates: 1 March–4 March
- Administrator: Government of Bihar and Amateur Kabaddi Federation of India; Recognised by International Kabaddi Federation
- Format: Standard style
- Tournament format(s): Round-robin and Knockout
- Host: India
- Venue(s): Patliputra Sports Complex, Kankarbagh, Patna
- Participants: 16

Final positions
- Champions: India
- 1st runners-up: Iran
- 2nd runners-up: Japan; Thailand

Tournament statistics
- Matches played: 31

The 2012 Women's Kabaddi World Cup was the first Kabaddi World Cup held for women that was recognised by the International Kabaddi Federation. It was organised by the Government of Bihar and the Amateur Kabaddi Federation of India. It was held at Patna from 1 to 4 March 2012 at the Patliputra Sports Complex, Kankarbagh. Hosts India won the World Cup defeating Iran in the finals.

== Teams ==
A total of 16 teams took part in the World Cup. The teams are :

- Bangladesh
- Canada
- Chinese Taipei
- India (Hosts)
- Indonesia
- Iran
- Italy
- Japan
- South Korea
- Malaysia
- Mexico
- Nepal
- Thailand
- Turkmenistan
- United States
- Sri Lanka

== Venue ==
All the matches were held at Patliputra Sports Complex, Kankarbagh, Bihar.

== Groups ==
The teams were divided into 4 groups of 4 teams each:

Group A	Group B	Group C	Group D
India	Thailand	Bangladesh	Iran
South Korea	Japan	Sri Lanka	Indonesia
Chinese Taipei	Canada	Italy	Nepal
Mexico	Turkmenistan	Malaysia	United States

== Group stage ==
Key to colours in group tables
Group winners and runners-up advance to the quarter-finals

=== Group A ===
Country	Played	Won	Lost	Draw	Points
India	3	3	0	0	6
South Korea	3	2	1	0	4
Chinese Taipei	3	1	2	0	2
Mexico	3	0	3	0	0

1 March 2012
17:00

India	38–14	South Korea

2 March 2012
09:00

Chinese Taipei	88–21	Mexico

2 March 2012
16:00

India	43–18	Chinese Taipei

2 March 2012
17:00

South Korea	72–14	Mexico

3 March 2012
08:00

South Korea	33–29	Chinese Taipei

3 March 2012
10:00

India	49–23	Mexico

=== Group B ===
Country	Played	Won	Lost	Draw	Points
Thailand	3	3	0	0	6
Japan	3	2	1	0	4
Canada	3	1	2	0	2
Turkmenistan	3	0	3	0	0

2 March 2012
08:00

Thailand	64–19	Turkmenistan

2 March 2012
10:00

Japan	29–8	Canada

2 March 2012
15:00

Japan	51–10	Turkmenistan

2 March 2012
17:00

Thailand	44–14	Canada

3 March 2012
09:00

Thailand	21–20	Japan

3 March 2012
11:00

Turkmenistan	27–68	Canada

=== Group C ===
Country	Played	Won	Lost	Draw	Points
Bangladesh	3	3	0	0	6
Sri Lanka	3	2	1	0	4
Italy	3	1	2	0	2
Malaysia	3	0	3	0	0

2 March 2012
09:00

Bangladesh	70–30	Malaysia

2 March 2012
10:00

Sri Lanka	75–13	Italy

2 March 2012
16:00

Sri Lanka	74–11	Malaysia

2 March 2012
18:00

Bangladesh	85–11	Italy

3 March 2012
09:00

Malaysia	55–57	Italy

3 March 2012
10:00

Bangladesh	38–26	Sri Lanka

=== Group D ===
Country	Played	Won	Lost	Draw	Points
Iran	3	3	0	0	6
Indonesia	3	2	1	0	4
Nepal	3	1	2	0	2
United States	3	0	3	0	0

2 March 2012
08:00

Iran	53–20	Nepal

2 March 2012
15:00

Indonesia	78–31	United States

2 March 2012
18:00

Indonesia	60–30	Nepal

2 March 2012
19:00

Iran	50–38	United States

3 March 2012
08:00

Iran	57–28	Indonesia

3 March 2012
11:00

Nepal	72–50	United States

== Knockout stage ==
Quarter-finals
3 March – Patliputra Sports Complex, Kankerbagh
India	66
Indonesia	20
3 March – Patliputra Sports Complex, Kankerbagh
Japan	17
Bangladesh	15
3 March – Patliputra Sports Complex, Kankerbagh
Thailand	30
Sri Lanka	18
3 March – Patliputra Sports Complex, Kankerbagh
Iran	40
South Korea	16

Semi-finals
4 March – Patliputra Sports Complex, Kankerbagh
India	59
Japan	20
4 March – Patliputra Sports Complex, Kankerbagh
Thailand	26
Iran	46

Final
4 March – Patliputra Sports Complex, Kankerbagh
India	25
Iran	19

=== Quarter-Finals ===
3 March 2012
16:00

India	66–20	Indonesia

3 March 2012
17:00

Japan	17–15	Bangladesh

3 March 2012
18:00

Thailand	30–18	Sri Lanka

3 March 2012
19:00

Iran	40–16	South Korea

=== Semi-Finals ===
4 March 2012
15:30

Thailand	26–46	Iran

4 March 2012
16:30

India	59–20	Japan

=== Final ===
4 March 2012
18:00

India	25–19	Iran

2012 Women's Kabaddi World Cup
1st Runner-up	Champions	2nd Runner-up	
Iran	India (1st Title)	Japan	Thailand
