= Patliputra Sports Complex =

Multi-purpose stadium Patna, Bihar, India

Coordinates: 25°35′44″N 85°9′12″E

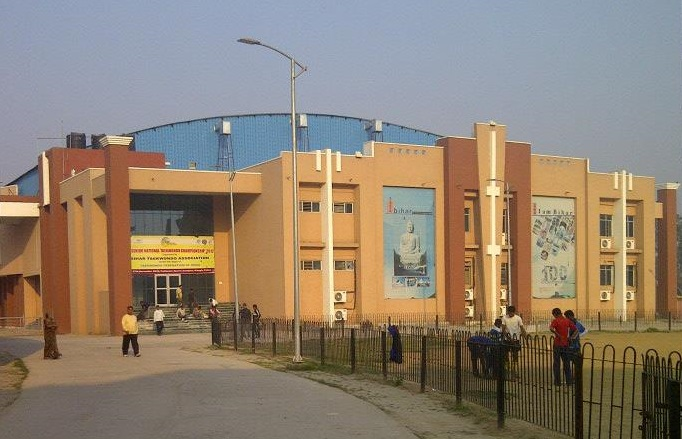
- Patliputra Sports Complex
- Interactive map of Patliputra Sports Complex
- Former names: Kankarbagh Sports Complex
- Location: Kankarbagh, Bihar
- Owner: Bihar State Sports Authority; Directorate of Youth Welfare & Sports of Bihar.
- Capacity: 20,000(outdoor) 3,500(indoor)

Construction
- Built: 2011
- Opened: 1 March 2012
- Cost: ₹19.98 Cr

Tenant
- Patna Pirates

The Patliputra Stadium at the Patliputra Sports Complex is a multi-purpose stadium in Kankarbagh, Patna, Bihar. The first Women World Cup Kabaddi Championship was held at the stadium in its inaugural year, in which 16 countries had participated. It also hosted seven league matches of new Pro Kabaddi League with its home team Patna Pirates from 7 to 10 August in 2014.

== Information ==
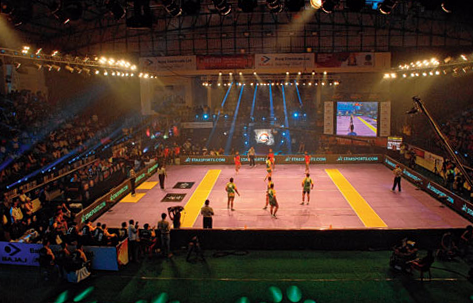
Indoor Stadium during a Pro Kabaddi League match

The sports complex was inaugurated on 1 March 2012 with the inauguration of the first Women's World Cup Kabaddi Championship in India. 16 national teams participated. All India Federation Cup Wrestling tournament 2012 in March, the 31st National Taekwondo Championship was also held here in this sports complex in December, 2012. The 26th All India Postal Carrom Tournament was held in 2022=2023 at the indoor stadium of the complex.

The Bihar State Sports Authority (BSSA) and the Directorate of Youth Welfare and Sports own the complex and by default, control all the sports activities organised at the complex. The approximate total cost accrued in building the sports complex has been estimated at ₹19.98 Crore.

== Facilities ==
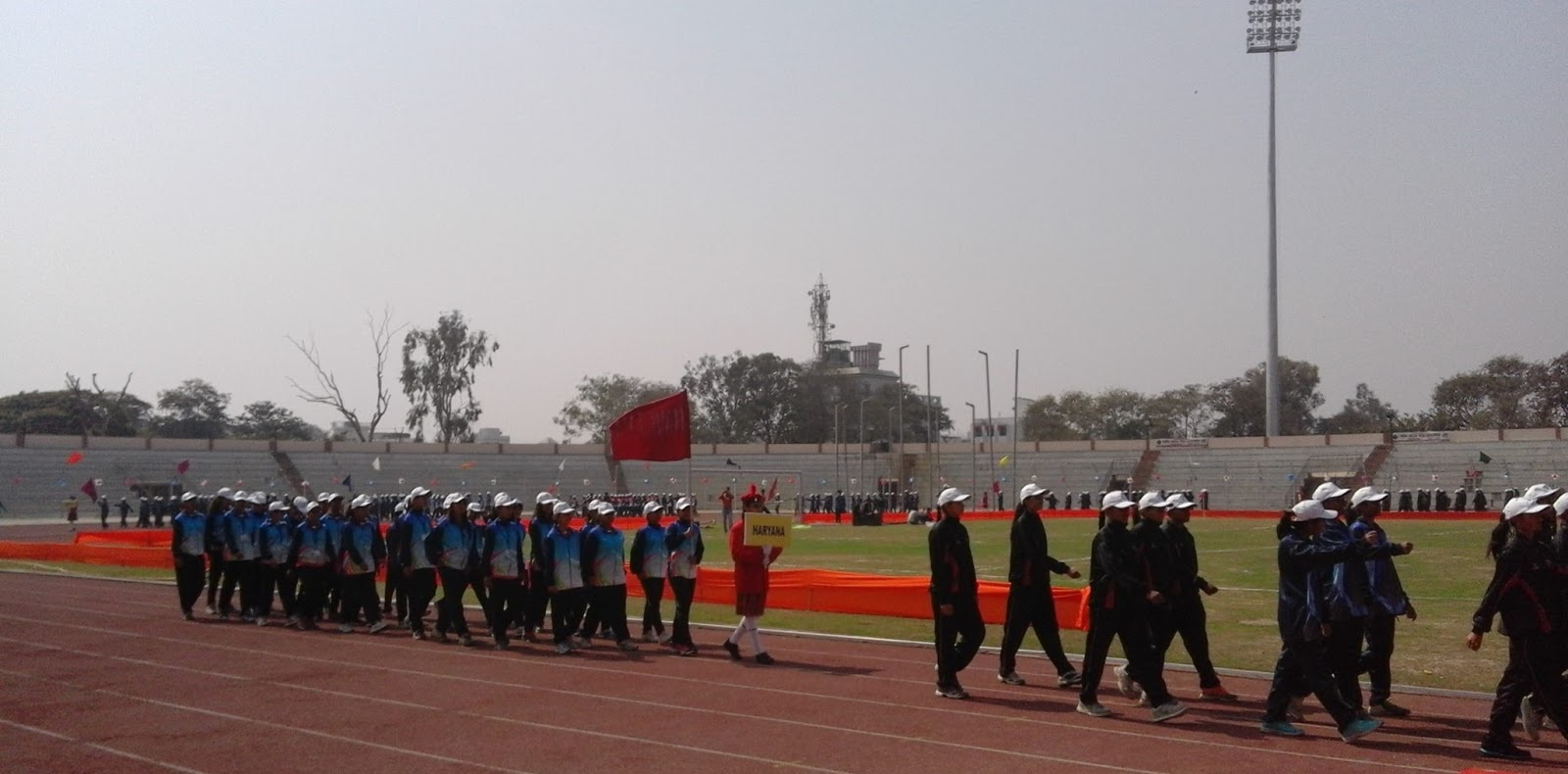
Patliputra outdoor stadium

The Sport Complex is a modern state-of-the-art complex, having facilities for both indoor and outdoor games. It is spread over 16 acres (6.5 hectares) It has a 400 meter athlete track, swimming pool and accommodation facilities for 200 sportspersons. A gymnasium is also on cards. Football, boxing, kabaddi, table tennis, carrom, swimming, wrestling, Basketball, taekwondo are some of the games organised here.

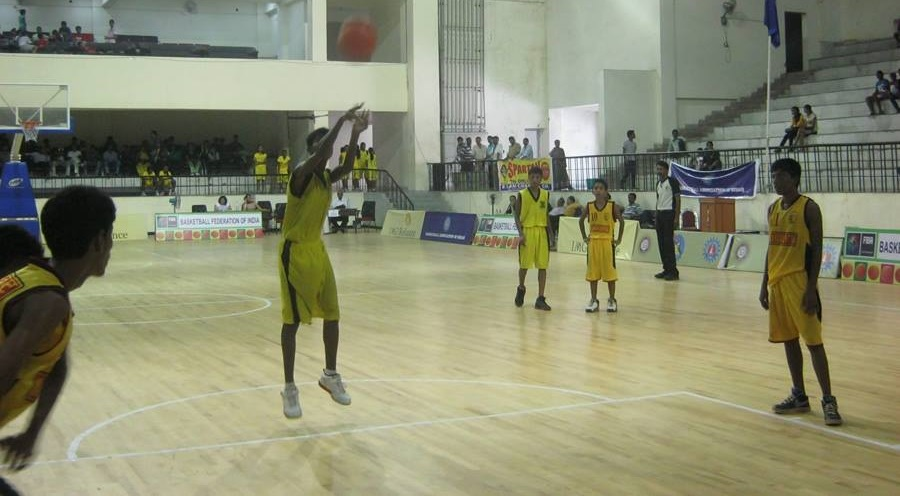
Patliputra indoor stadium

The sports complex is divided into four wings: Outdoor, Indoor, Coaches and Hostel. The outdoor stadium, Patliputra Stadium, has a capacity of 20,000 spectators, whereas the Patliputra Indoor Stadium has a capacity of 3,500 spectators. It is also being used for training or coaches. Its hostel facility comprises separate wing of 227 rooms. The outdoor stadium hosts athletics, football, kabaddi and rugby sevens.

== Tournaments ==
Major tournaments

1	2012	Women's World Cup Kabaddi Championship
2	2012	All India Federation Cup Wrestling tournament
3	2012	31st National Taekwondo Championship
4	2013	40th Sub-junior National Basketball Championship
5	2013	All India Bihar Cup Football Tournament
6	2014	75th Senior National Table Tennis Championship
7	2014	39th Junior National Badminton Championships

== See also ==
- Rajgir Sports Complex
- Moin-ul-Haq Stadium
- 2012 Women's Kabaddi World Cup
