= Milinda Chathuranga =

Sri Lankan kabaddi player

Personal information
- Nationality: Sri Lankan
- Born: 23 April 1991 (age 35)
- Weight: 79 kg (174 lb)

Sport
- Country: Sri Lanka
- Sport: kabaddi
- Position: raider
- League: Pro Kabaddi League
- Club: Jaipur Pink Panthers
Medal record
Representing Sri Lanka
Men's Kabaddi
Asian Beach Games
Bronze medal – third place	2026 Sanya	team
Bronze medal – third place	2016 Danang	team
Bronze medal – third place	2014 Patong Beach	team

Milinda Chathuranga (born 23 April 1991) is a Sri Lankan kabaddi player represents Sri Lanka in international matches and also currently plays for Jaipur Pink Panthers in the Indian Pro Kabaddi League.

He was bought by Jaipur Pink Panthers for a bidding price of 10 lakhs during the auction for the 2019 Pro Kabaddi League.

== Career ==
Milinda has represented Sri Lanka in few international competitions including the Asian Beach Games and in the Asian Games. He was part of the Sri Lankan team which claimed bronze medals in the 2014 and 2016 editions of the Asian Beach Games.

He was also a member of the Sri Lankan squad which took part at the 2018 Asian Games where Sri Lanka finished at seventh position in the men's kabaddi team event.
