= Junior Kabaddi World Cup =

International kabaddi competition

- Founded: 2019; 7 years ago
- First season: 2019
- Administrator: International Kabaddi Federation
- Region: International
- Most recent champion: M: India (1st title)
- Most titles: M: Iran and India (1 title each)

The Junior Kabaddi World Cup, formerly called the Junior World Kabaddi Championship, is an indoor junior international kabaddi competition conducted by the International Kabaddi Federation (IKF) in a standard style. In 2019, the first Junior Kabaddi World Cup was held in Iran and was won by the hosts. The second edition which was also held in Iran was won by India.

With the return of international kabaddi post COVID-19 pandemic and the 2022 Asian Games, the IKF in 2024 announced the calendar with the third Junior Men's World Cup in 2025 and the start of the inaugural Junior Women's World Cup in 2024.

== Editions and results ==
=== Men ===
Year	Host	Final			Third place	
Year	Host	Champions	Score	Runner-up	Third place	
2019	(Iran); Kish Island	Iran	42–22	Kenya	Bangladesh	Pakistan
2023	(Iran); Urmia	India	41–33	Iran	Nepal	Pakistan
2025	(Iran)	TBD				

=== Women ===
Year	Host	Final			Third place
Year	Host	Champions	Score	Runner-up	Third place
2024	(India)	TBD			

== Results ==
=== 2019 Men ===
20-25 Aban 1398

A: Iran/Thailand/Malaysia/Turkmenistan

B: Pakistan/Azerbaijan/Denmark

C: Afghanistan/Chinese Taipei/Bangladesh

D: Kenya/Iraq/Sri Lanka

1. Pakistan 72-23 Denmark
2. Malaysia 76-26 Turkmenistan
3. Kenya 38-30 Iraq
4. Iran 60-19 Thailand
5. Bangladesh 84-11 Afghanistan
6. Kenya 40-31 Sri Lanka
7. Denmark 64-44 Azerbaijan
8. Bangladesh 48-36 Sri Lanka
9. Thailand 57-25 Malaysia
10. Iran 90-46 Turkmenistan
11. Chinese Taipei 71-33 Afghanistan
12. Thailand 58-15 Turkmenistan
13. Pakistan 52-38 Azerbaijan
14. Sri Lanka 45-24 Iraq
15. Iran 70-29 Malaysia

Quarterfinal:

1. Iran 53-31 Chinese Taipei
2. Bangladesh 62-37 Thailand
3. Denmark 24-79 Kenya
4. Pakistan 44-32 Sri Lanka

Semifinal:

1. Kenya 48-39 Pakistan
2. Iran 52-20 Bangladesh

Final:

1. Iran 42-22 Kenya

=== 2023 Men ===
7 To 14 Esfand 1401

A: Iran/Chinese Taipei/Uganda

B: Kenya/Iraq/Palestine

C: India/Bangladesh/Thailand

D: Pakistan/Nepal/Georgia

1. Iraq 71-19 Palestine
2. Iran 62-25 Chinese Taipei
3. Pakistan 61-41 Nepal
4. Bangladesh 69-48 Thailand
5. Iraq 56-39 Kenya
6. Chinese Taipei 42-40 Uganda
7. India 74-23 Bangladesh
8. Iran 67-28 Uganda
9. Pakistan 73-30 Georgia
10. Kenya 75-15 Palestine
11. Nepal 84-17 Georgia
12. India 67-34 Thailand

Quarterfinal:

1. Pakistan 56-24 Kenya
2. India 54-36 Chinese Taipei
3. Nepal 64-63 Iraq
4. Iran 56-17 Bangladesh

Semifinal:

1. Iran 60-37 Nepal
2. India 74-29 Pakistan

Final:

1. India 41-33 Iran

== Links ==
- https://web.archive.org/web/20171211112111/https://theroonba.com/
- https://web.archive.org/web/20171211235337/http://theroonba.com/kabaddi/men/2017.html
- https://web.archive.org/web/20171215091007/http://theroonba.com/indoorkabaddi/men/2017.html
- https://web.archive.org/web/20171215090934/http://theroonba.com/beachkabaddi/men/2017.html
- https://web.archive.org/web/20200225222023/http://www.theroonba.com/indoorkabaddi/men/ranking.html
- https://web.archive.org/web/20171015195143/http://www.theroonba.com/indoorkabaddi/men/2016.html
- https://web.archive.org/web/20250000000000*/http://www.theroonba.com/indoorkabaddi/men/ranking.html
