= Ritu Negi =

Indian kabaddi player

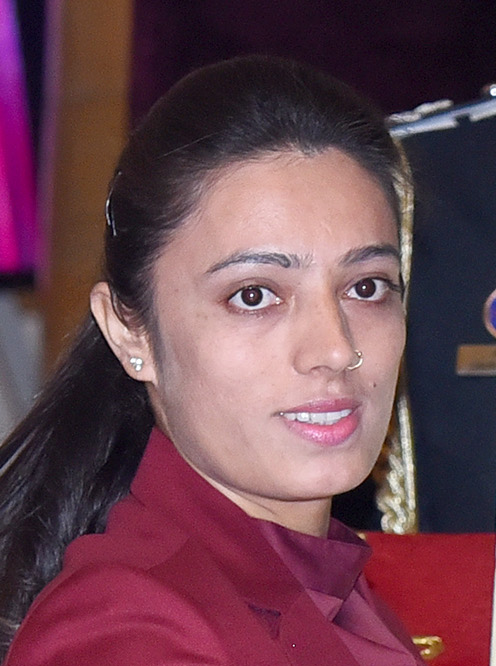
Negi in 2024

Ritu Negi (born 30 May 1992) is an Indian kabaddi player from HImachal Pradesh. She was the captain of the Indian team which won the gold medal at the 2025 Kabaddi World Cup, by defeating Chinese Taipei in the final, on 7 October 2023.

HImachal Pradesh Chief Minister Sukhwinder Singh Sukhu honoured the state medallists who won medals at the Asian Games. She was presented a cash award of Rs.1.5 million.

== Career ==
Negi was a member of the Indian kabaddi team that won the silver medal at the 2018 Asian Games, as well as the team that won a gold at the 2019 South Asian Games.

== Personal life ==
Ritu is from Sharog village, in the Shillai area of Transgiri region in the Sirmaur district of Himachal Pradesh. She is married to Rohit Gulia, who is also a kabaddi player.

== Awards ==
Negi was honored with the Arjuna Award by the President of the India on 9 January 2024.
