= Bangladesh women's national kabaddi team =

Bangladeshi women's national kabaddi team

Bangladesh
- Association: Bangladesh Kabaddi Federation
- Confederation: Asian Kabaddi Federation (AKF)

World Cup
- 2 (first in 2012)
- (bronze) 3rd (2025)

Asian Games
- 5 (first in 2010)
- (bronze) 3rd (2010, 2014)

Asian Championship
- 2 (first in 2005)
- (bronze) 3rd (2005, 2025)
Medal record
Event	1st	2nd	3rd
World Cup	0	0	1
Asian Games	0	0	2
Asian Championship	0	0	2
Asian Beach Games	0	0	3
South Asian Games	0	2	2
South Asian Beach Games	0	0	1
Total	0	2	11
World Cup
Bronze medal – third place	2025 Bangladesh	
Asian Games
Bronze medal – third place	2010 Guangzhou	
Bronze medal – third place	2014 Incheon	
Asian Championship
Bronze medal – third place	2005 India	
Bronze medal – third place	2025 Iran	
Asian Beach Games
Bronze medal – third place	2010 Muscat	
Bronze medal – third place	2012 Haiyang	
Bronze medal – third place	2026 Sanya	
South Asian Games
Silver medal – second place	2010 Dhaka	
Silver medal – second place	2016 Guwahati	
Bronze medal – third place	2006 Colombo	
Bronze medal – third place	2019 Kathmandu	
South Asian Beach Games
Bronze medal – third place	2011 Hambantota	

Bangladesh women's national kabaddi team represents Bangladesh in international women's kabaddi competitions. Governed by the Bangladesh Kabaddi Federation, it won its first Women's Kabaddi World Cup medal, a bronze, as hosts of the 2025 edition, and has won bronze medals at the Asian Games (2010 and 2014) and at the Asian Beach Games (2010, 2012 and 2026).

== Recent history ==
Bangladesh finished fifth at the inaugural 2012 Women's Kabaddi World Cup in India, topping its group and reaching the quarter-finals. At the 2025 Women's Kabaddi World Cup in Dhaka, the hosts won Group A matches against Uganda (42–22), Germany (57–27) and Thailand (40–31) and lost 43–18 to India, then lost the semi-final 25–18 to Chinese Taipei and took the bronze medal, the team's first at a World Cup.

In April 2026 Bangladesh won a bronze medal in beach kabaddi at the 2026 Asian Beach Games in Sanya, its first medal in the event for 14 years. It beat Thailand 51–34 and Chinese Taipei in Group B, finished second behind Nepal, and lost the semi-final 50–31 to India.

At the 2026 Asian Games in Aichi–Nagoya, Bangladesh lost 42–21 to India and 54–19 to Iran and beat Japan 42–22 in Group A, finishing third in the group and missing the semi-finals. At the 2026 Commonwealth Kabaddi Championship in Ahmedabad in October 2026 the women's team went out in the group stage.

== Tournament history ==
=== Standard kabaddi ===
==== World Cup ====
World Cup
Year	Results	M	W	D	L	PF	PA	PD
(India) 2012	Quarter-finals (5th)	4	3	0	1	208	84	+124
(Bangladesh) 2025	(bronze) 3rd	5	3	0	2	175	148	+27
Total	2/2	9	6	0	3	383	232	+151

==== Asian Games ====
Year	Appearances	Rank
(China) 2010	1st	3rd place
(South Korea) 2014	2nd	3rd place
(Indonesia) 2018	3rd	7th place
(China) 2022	4th	6th place
(Japan) 2026	5th	Group stage (3rd in Group A)

===== 2026 Asian Games results =====
Date	Round	Opponent	Score
21 September 2026	Group A	India	21–42
23 September 2026	Group A	Japan	42–22
—	Group A	Iran	19–54

==== Asian Kabaddi Championship ====
Year	Appearances	Rank
(India) 2005	1st	3rd place
(Iran) 2025	2nd	3rd place

==== Commonwealth Kabaddi Championship ====
Year	Rank
(India) 2026	Group stage

==== South Asian Games ====
Year	Appearances	Rank
(Sri Lanka) 2006	1st	3rd Place
(Bangladesh) 2010	2nd	2nd Place
(India) 2016	3rd	2nd Place
(Nepal) 2019	4th	3rd Place

=== Beach kabaddi ===
==== Asian Beach Games ====
Year	Rank
(Oman) 2010	(bronze) 3rd
(China) 2012	(bronze) 3rd
(Thailand) 2014	5th place
(Vietnam) 2016	Group stage
(China) 2026	(bronze) 3rd; lost semi-final 50–31 to India

==== South Asian Beach Games ====
Year	Appearances	Rank
(Sri Lanka) 2011	1st	3rd place

== Recent results ==
Event	Dates	Venue	Result
Commonwealth Kabaddi Championship	23–31 October 2026	Ahmedabad, India	Group stage
Asian Games	21–26 September 2026	Aichi–Nagoya, Japan	Group stage (1 win, 2 defeats)
Asian Beach Games	22–30 April 2026	Sanya, China	Bronze (lost semi-final to India 50–31)
Women's Kabaddi World Cup	17–24 November 2025	Dhaka, Bangladesh	Bronze (lost semi-final to Chinese Taipei 25–18)

=== 2025 Women's Kabaddi World Cup results ===
Date	Round	Opponent	Score
17 November 2025	Group A	Uganda	42–22
—	Group A	Germany	57–27
19 November 2025	Group A	India	18–43
22 November 2025	Group A	Thailand	40–31
23 November 2025	Semi-final	Chinese Taipei	18–25
