= Thailand women's national kabaddi team =

Thai women's national kabaddi team

Thailand
- Association: Thailand Kabaddi Association
- Confederation: Asian Kabaddi Federation (AKF)
- Captain: Kamontip Tippichaikul

World Cup
- 2 (first in 2012)
- (bronze) 3rd (joint) (2012)

Asian Games
- 5 (first in 2010)
- (silver) 2nd (2010)
Medal record
| Event | 1st | 2nd | 3rd |
|---|---|---|---|
| World Cup | 0 | 0 | 1 |
| Asian Games | 0 | 1 | 2 |
| Asian Beach Games | 0 | 1 | 0 |
| Total | 0 | 2 | 3 |
World Cup
| Bronze medal – third place | 2012 India | |
Asian Games
| Silver medal – second place | 2010 Guangzhou | |
| Bronze medal – third place | 2014 Incheon | |
| Bronze medal – third place | 2018 Jakarta | |
Asian Beach Games
| Silver medal – second place | 2016 Danang | |

The Thailand women's national kabaddi team represents Thailand in international women's kabaddi competitions. Governed by the Thailand Kabaddi Association and affiliated with the International Kabaddi Federation, the team has competed at all five women's kabaddi tournaments at the Asian Games, winning one silver and two bronze medals, and won a bronze medal at the 2012 Women's Kabaddi World Cup.

== History ==
=== Asian Games debut and medals (2010–2018) ===
In the 2010 Asian Games, Thailand won all three of its group matches and defeated Bangladesh in the semi-finals to reach the final, where it lost 28–14 to India.

In the 2012 Women's Kabaddi World Cup in Patna, Thailand reached the semi-finals, where it lost 46–26 to Iran, and was awarded a bronze medal alongside Japan, as no third-place match was played. In the 2014 Asian Games it won a bronze medal, and in the 2016 Asian Beach Games it won silver after losing the final to India.

In the 2018 Asian Games, Thailand won three of its four group matches, losing only to India, then lost the semi-final to Iran and took the bronze medal.

=== Recent years (2022–present) ===
At the 2022 Asian Games, held in Hangzhou in 2023, Thailand beat South Korea in its first match but lost to India and Chinese Taipei, finishing fifth with one win from three matches.

In March 2025 Thailand took part in the Asian Women's Kabaddi Championship in Tehran, where it lost 76–21 to India, and in November 2025 it played in the Women's Kabaddi World Cup in Dhaka, losing 64–20 to India in the group stage.

At the 2026 Asian Games in Aichi–Nagoya, Thailand, captained by Kamontip Tippichaikul, beat Sri Lanka 40–28 but lost narrowly to Nepal 43–46 and to Chinese Taipei 31–43, finishing third in Group B and missing the semi-finals.

== Competitive record ==
=== World Cup ===
| Year | Rank |
|---|---|
| (India) 2012 | Third place (joint with Japan) |
| (Bangladesh) 2025 | Group stage |

=== Asian Games ===
| Year | Rank | M | W | D | L | PF | PA | PD |
|---|---|---|---|---|---|---|---|---|
| (China) 2010 | Runners-up | 5 | 4 | 0 | 1 | 178 | 137 | +41 |
| (South Korea) 2014 | Third place | 4 | 2 | 0 | 2 | 118 | 119 | -1 |
| (Indonesia) 2018 | Third place | 5 | 3 | 0 | 2 | 158 | 98 | +60 |
| (China) 2022 | Fifth place | 3 | 1 | 0 | 2 | 93 | 114 | -21 |
| (Japan) 2026 | Group stage | 3 | 1 | 0 | 2 | 114 | 117 | -3 |
| Total | 5/5 | 20 | 11 | 0 | 9 | 661 | 585 | +76 |

==== 2026 Asian Games results ====
| Date | Round | Opponent | Score |
|---|---|---|---|
| 21 September 2026 | Group B | Sri Lanka | 40–28 |
| 22 September 2026 | Group B | Nepal | 43–46 |
| 24 September 2026 | Group B | Chinese Taipei | 31–43 |

== Current squad ==
The following squad was named for the 2026 Asian Games.

Player
Kamontip Tippichaikul (Captain)
Sirada Chanchaemsri
Saengdao Ramsin
Pawarisa Eaddam
Diana Deesalarm
Papaporn Jaiyod
Thanyalak Benrit
Bencharat Khwanchai
Natthidaphorn Kaewmai
Wassana Rachmanee
Wanatsanan Tipkonglas
Phanida Autthapong

== See also ==
- Thailand national kabaddi team
- Sport in Thailand
