= Iran women's national kabaddi team =

Iranian women's kabaddi team

Iran
- Association: Kabaddi Federation of I.R. Iran
- Confederation: Asian Kabaddi Federation (AKF)
- Head Coach: (Iran) Gholamreza Mazandarani
- Captain: Ghazal Khalaj

World Cup
- 2 (first in 2012)
- Runners-up (2012)

Asian Games
- 5 (first in 2010)
- Champions (2018)

Asian Kabaddi Championship
- 6 (first in 2005)
- Runners-up (2007, 2008, 2025)
Medal record
Event	1st	2nd	3rd
World Cup	0	1	1
Asian Games	1	2	2
Asian Championship	0	3	2
Asian Indoor Games	0	1	0
Total	1	7	5
World Cup
Silver medal – second place	2012 India	
Bronze medal – third place	2025 Bangladesh	
Asian Games
Gold medal – first place	2018 Jakarta	
Silver medal – second place	2014 Incheon	
Silver medal – second place	2026 Aichi–Nagoya	
Bronze medal – third place	2010 Guangzhou	
Bronze medal – third place	2022 Hangzhou	
Asian Championship
Silver medal – second place	2007 Iran	
Silver medal – second place	2008 India	
Silver medal – second place	2025 Iran	
Bronze medal – third place	2016 South Korea	
Bronze medal – third place	2017 Iran	
Asian Indoor Games
Silver medal – second place	2013 Incheon	

The Iran women's national kabaddi team represents the Islamic Republic of Iran in international women's kabaddi competitions. Governed by the Kabaddi Federation of I.R. Iran, the team made its debut at the Asian Kabaddi Championship in 2005 and is one of the leading women's sides in Asia. It won the women's gold medal at the 2018 Asian Games, becoming the first team other than India to do so, and has since won silver in 2026 after a 37–34 defeat to India in the final.

Iran finished runners-up at the inaugural Women's Kabaddi World Cup in 2012 and jointly third at the 2025 edition in Dhaka, where it lost the semi-final to India 33–21. The team has finished runners-up at the Asian Kabaddi Championship in 2007, 2008 and 2025, the last on home soil in Tehran.

== History ==
=== Early years (2005–2017) ===
Iran's women first played at the Asian Kabaddi Championship in 2005, finishing fifth, and reached the final of the 2007 edition, which was hosted in Iran, and the 2008 edition. Women's kabaddi was added to the 2010 Asian Games in Guangzhou, where Iran took bronze, and Iran reached the final of the inaugural 2012 Women's Kabaddi World Cup in India, losing to the hosts. Iran won silver at the 2014 Asian Games in Incheon and bronze at the 2016 and 2017 Asian Championships.

=== Asian Games champions (2018) ===
At the 2018 Asian Games in Jakarta, Iran beat India 27–24 in the final to win its first Asian Games gold in kabaddi, ending India's run of gold medals in the women's event. Iran took bronze at the 2022 Asian Games in Hangzhou.

=== Recent years (2025–present) ===
In March 2025 Iran hosted the Asian Women's Kabaddi Championship in Tehran and finished as runners-up to India, who beat Iran 32–25 in their match. At the 2025 Women's Kabaddi World Cup in Dhaka, Iran won four of its five group matches, beating Poland 55–11, Kenya 42–10, Zanzibar 51–15 and Nepal 39–11 and losing to Chinese Taipei, then lost the semi-final to India 33–21 and shared third place with Bangladesh.

Ahead of the 2026 Asian Games, a young squad led by head coach Gholamreza Mazandarani, with more than 80 per cent of the team changed since the previous Asian Games, held a six-day camp at the Sports Authority of India centre in Sonepat, India, in August 2026, playing practice matches against the Indian women's team. At the 2026 Asian Games in Aichi–Nagoya Iran lost to India 37–23 in the group stage and again in the final on 26 September, 37–34, to take silver.

== Tournament records ==
*Red border indicates that the tournament was hosted on home soil. Gold, silver, bronze backgrounds indicate 1st, 2nd and 3rd finishes respectively. Bold text indicates best finish in tournament.

=== Standard kabaddi ===
==== Kabaddi World Cup ====
Year	Rank	Pld	W	D	L
(India) 2012	**Runners-up**	6	5	0	1
(Bangladesh) 2025	Third place (joint)	6	4	0	2
Total	2/2	12	9	0	3

==== Asian Games ====
Year	Rank	M	W	D	L	PF	PA	PD
(China) 2010	**Third place**	4	2	0	2	195	92	+103
(South Korea) 2014	**Runners-up**	5	4	0	1	175	113	+62
(Indonesia) 2018	**Champions**	5	4	0	1	161	111	+50
(China) 2022	**Third place**	3	2	0	1	121	70	+51
(Japan) 2026	**Runners-up**	5	3	0	2	197	132	+65
Total	5/5	22	15	0	7	849	518	+331

==== Asian Kabaddi Championship ====
Year	Rank	Pld	W	D	L
(India) 2005	Fifth place	3	1	0	2
(Iran) 2007	**Runners-up**	4	3	0	1
(India) 2008	**Runners-up**	6	5	0	1
(South Korea) 2016	**Third place**	4	3	0	1
(Iran) 2017	**Third place**	5	4	0	1
(Iran) 2025	**Runners-up**	4	3	0	1
Total	6/6	26	19	0	7

=== Indoor kabaddi ===
==== Asian Indoor and Martial Arts Games ====
Year	Rank	Pld	W	D	L
(South Korea) 2013	**Runners-up**	5	4	0	1
Total	1/1	5	4	0	1

== Recent results ==
=== Recent results ===
Event	Dates	Venue	Result
Asian Games	September 2026	Aichi–Nagoya, Japan	Runners-up (lost to India 37–34 in final)
Women's Kabaddi World Cup	17–24 November 2025	Dhaka, Bangladesh	Third place (joint; lost semi-final to India 33–21)
Asian Kabaddi Championship	6–8 March 2025	Tehran, Iran	Runners-up

=== 2025 Women's Kabaddi World Cup results ===
Date	Round	Opponent	Score
17 November 2025	Group B	Poland	55–11
18 November 2025	Group B	Kenya	42–10
19 November 2025	Group B	(Tanzania) Zanzibar	51–15
20 November 2025	Group B	Chinese Taipei	Lost
22 November 2025	Group B	Nepal	39–11
23 November 2025	Semi-final	India	21–33

== Current squad ==
The following 12 players represented Iran at the 2026 Asian Games, where the team won silver. Zahra Karimi was the captain.

Player	Role
Zahra Karimi	Captain
Zahra Astereki	
Atena Madadi	
Saniya Naeimi	
Aynaz Faramarzi	
Nikta Jalalvand	
Hadiseh Varasteh	
Zahra Khodabandehloo	
Sahar Yari	
Mahtab Lakaliabadi	
Fereshteh Kolagar	
Zakiyeh Malmali	

=== Former players ===
The following players appeared in an earlier listing of the squad but were not in the 2026 Asian Games roster. Ghazal Khalaj captained the team that won the 2018 Asian Games gold medal.

- Ghazal Khalaj
- Mahboobeh Sanchooli
- Saeideh Jafari
- Sedigheh Jafari
- Roya Davoudiankhan
- Farideh Zarif Doost
- Mohaddeseh Rajabloo
- Fatemeh Khodabandehloo
- Fatemeh Mansouri
- Maryam Solgi
- Raheleh Naderi

== Coaching staff ==
Position	Name
Head coach	(Iran) Gholamreza Mazandarani

== Honours ==
=== World ===
- World Cup:
  - Runners-up (1): 2012
  - Third place (1, joint): 2025

=== Asia ===
- Asian Games:
  - Gold Medal (1): 2018
  - Silver Medal (2): 2014, 2026
  - Bronze Medal (2): 2010, 2022
- Asian Kabaddi Championship:
  - Runners-up (3): 2007, 2008, 2025
  - Third place (2): 2016, 2017
- Asian Indoor Games:
  - Silver Medal (1): 2013

== See also ==
- Sport in Iran
- India women's national kabaddi team
- Iran men's national kabaddi team
