= Variations of kabaddi =

Kabaddi pictogram

Kabaddi is a contact sport of South Asian origin which has many variations.

== History ==
Traditional kabaddi was played differently from modern kabaddi, in part because of the launch of the Pro Kabaddi League (PKL) in 2014 which added and changed certain rules. For example, some styles of modern kabaddi feature a 30-second time limit on each raid, whereas traditional kabaddi had no time limits, with raiders instead having been required to complete the raid on one breath, chanting "kabaddi" repeatedly to prove to the referee that they were not inhaling.

== Main disciplines ==
=== Standard style ===
In the international team version of kabaddi, two teams of seven members each occupy opposite halves of a court of 10 by 13 metres (33 ft × 43 ft) in the case of men and 8 by 12 metres (26 ft × 39 ft) in the case of women. Each has five supplementary players held in reserve for substitution. The game is played with 20-minute halves with a 5-minute halftime break during which the teams exchange sides. During each play, known as a "raid", a player from the attacking side, known as the "raider", runs into the opposing team's side of the court and attempts to tag as many of the seven defending players as possible. The raider must cross the baulk line into the defending team's territory, and then return to their half of the field without being tackled. (If an attacker touches a defender and has not yet reached the baulk line, they do not need to reach the baulk line to score points and may return to their half of the court.) While raiding, the raider must loudly chant kabaddi, confirming to referees that the raid is completed on a single breath without inhaling. Each raid has a 30-second time limit.

A point is scored for each defender tagged; tags can be made with any part of the raider's body by touching any part of the defender's body. If the raider steps beyond the bonus line marked in the defending team's territory when there are six or more players, they earn an additional point known as a bonus point (the bonus point is only scored if the raider's trailing foot is in the air while they step over the line). If the raider is successfully stopped (tackled), the opposing team earns a point instead. All players tagged or tackled are taken out of the game, but one is "revived" for each point a team scores from a subsequent tag or tackle. However, bonus points do not revive players. In addition, players who step out of the boundary are out. However, the boundary of the field can vary mid-raid; there are two strips on either side of the court known as "lobby areas" which only become part of the field of play in raids where the raider touches an opponent.

A raid where no points are scored by the raider is referred to as an "empty raid". By contrast, a play where the raider scores three or more points is referred to as a "super raid". If a team gets all seven players on the opposing team out ("All Out"), they earn two additional points and then all the opposition players are placed back in the game.

In the event of a tie, PKL rules stipulate (for playoff matches) that each team is to perform five raids on the other team, with no time limits involved, no players being dismissed or revived, and the baulk line being simultaneously treated as a bonus line.

=== Punjabi style (Circle-style) ===
In the Punjab region, kabaddi is played on a circular pitch of a diameter of 22 meters and an inner circle with a line through the middle of the pitch: the pitch is called kaudi da bharha. There are two teams of 8 players; one on one raid; and no player leaves the field. If 2 stoppers attack a player, a foul is declared. Punjab style kabaddi does not require the raider saying "kabaddi, kabaddi" throughout the raid. The game lasts for 40 minutes with a change in sides after 20 minutes.

In the Punjab Circle Style form of Kabaddi, whenever any player is touched, by a raider the player that is touched has 30 seconds to stop the opposing player from reaching their side of the half if the raider is stopped the point is awarded to the defenders team but if the raider makes it back to their side the point is award for the raiders team. If a raider or defender I steps out of bounds a point is awarded to the other team.

== Variants of standard kabaddi ==
=== Organisational variations ===
The International Kabaddi Federation (IKF) and World Kabaddi (WK) are two major international kabaddi organisations that have slightly different rules for kabaddi. IKF kabaddi matches have two halves, while WK are played in four quarters.

=== Beach kabaddi ===
Kabaddi played on a beach

Beach kabaddi is played in two 15-minute halves by two teams of four players who are not allowed to wear shoes. The field is smaller, and there are no bonus lines, baulk lines, or lobby area. Every raid is a do-or-die raid.

It is played at an international level in competitions such as the Asian Beach Games.

=== Indoor kabaddi ===
Indoor kabaddi is played in two 15-minute halves by two teams of five players and is a shorter variant of standard style kabaddi. It is played at an international level in competitions such as the Asian Indoor and Martial Arts Games.

== Variants of circle kabaddi ==
=== Lambi kauddi ===
In lambi kauddi (Punjabi: لمبی کوڈی/ਲੰਬੀ ਕੌਡੀ) there are 15 players with a circular pitch of 15–20 feet. There is no outer limit. The players can run as far they can. There is no referee. The raider will say "kauddi, kauddi" throughout the attack.

=== Saunchi kauddi ===
Saunchi kauddi (Punjabi: سانچی کوڈی/ਸੌਂਚੀ ਕੌਡੀ) (also called Saunchi pakki/Punjabi: ਸੌਂਚੀ ਪੱਕੀ) can best be described as being similar to boxing. It is popular in the Malwa area of Punjab. It is unlimited players with a circular playing pitch. A bamboo with red cloth is dug into the ground which is paraded by the winner.

In sauchi kabaddi, the raider will hit the defender but only on the chest. The defender will then hold the raiders wrist. A foul is declared if any other part of the body is grabbed. If the defender holds the raiders wrist and restricts his movement, he will be declared the winner. If the raider loses the grip of the defender, then the raider will be the winner.

=== Goongi kabaddi ===
A popular style is Goongi kabaddi (Punjabi: گونگی کبڈی/ਗੂੰਗੀ ਕਬੱਡੀ) (silent kabaddi) where a raider player does not speak and say the word kabaddi but just touches the opponent's team player and the person he touches is the only player who will try to stop the raider. The struggle will continue until the raider reaches the starting line or acknowledges defeat and loses a point; if the raider safely reaches the starting line, he will get the point.

=== Other traditional styles ===
- Chhe handhi (Punjabi: ਛੈ ਹੰਧੀ)
- Shamiali wali (Punjabi: ਸ਼ਮਿਆਲੀ ਵਾਲੀ)
- Peer kauddi (Punjabi: ਪੀਰ ਕੌਡੀ)
- Parh kauddi (Punjabi: ਪੜ ਕੋੋੋਡੀ)
- Badhi (Punjabi: ਬਧੀ)
- Baithvi (Punjabi: ਬੈਠਵੀ)
- Burjia wali (Punjabi: ਬੁਰਜੀਆ ਵਾਲੀ)
- Ghorh kabaddi (Punjabi: ਘੋੜ ਕਬੱਡੀ)
- Daudhey (Punjabi: ਦੋਧੇ)
- Cheervi (Punjabi: ਚੀਰਵੀ)
- Chatta wali (Punjabi: ਚਾਟਾ ਵਾਲੀ)
- Dhair kabaddi (Punjabi: ਢੇਰ ਕਬੱਡੀ) popular in Majha area of Punjab
- Ambarsari (Punjabi: ਅੰਬਰਸਰੀ)
- Ferozpuri (Punjabi: ਫ਼ਿਰੋਜ਼ਪੁਰੀ)
- Lahori (Punjabi: ਲਾਹੌਰੀ)
- Multani (Punjabi: ਮੁਲਤਾਨੀ)
- Lyallpuri (Punjabi: ਲਾੲਿਰਪੁਰੀ)
- Bahwalpuri (Punjabi: ਬਹਾਵਲਪੁਰੀ)
- Ambalvi (Punjabi: ਅੰਬਾਲਵੀ.

== Other variants ==
=== Ghoda kabaddi ===
Ghoda kabaddi is a variation of kabaddi in which one player on the offensive team (the ghoda or "horse") sits in a small circle deep within the defensive team's half of the field. Once touched by the raider, the horse can leave the circle and must then return to his team.

=== Budhiya kabaddi ===
Budhiya kabaddi originates from the Magadha region of India. It is played with two teams of four or more players. The scoring team has a player (called the budhiya or "old lady") who starts off positioned at the opposite end of the field from the "home" area. The old lady's goal is to reach home without being touched by any of the opponents.

=== Goongi kabaddi ===
A popular style is Goongi kabaddi (Punjabi: گونگی کبڈی/ਗੂੰਗੀ ਕਬੱਡੀ) (silent kabaddi) where a raider player does not speak and say the word kabaddi but just touches the opponent's team player and the person he touches is the only player who will try to stop the raider. The struggle will continue until the raider reaches the starting line or acknowledges defeat and loses a point; if the raider safely reaches the starting line, he will get the point.

=== Slap kabaddi ===
Slap kabaddi or thappad kabaddi is a Pakistani variant of kabaddi which is particularly popular in Punjab. Two players aim to slap each other, scoring one point for each slap landed on the opponent; the winner is the one who scores the most points, or who can force his opponent to forfeit the match.

Punches are not allowed, though players can slam into each other. There is no time limit or limit to the number of slaps that can be executed, though causing injury to the opponent results in disqualification in some matches.,

=== Whip kabaddi ===
In whip kabaddi, one player (the singer) stands in one half of the court, while all other players stand on the other side of the court and each hold a whip-like object (generally made of a soft material like cloth or paper). The singer's job is to sing while trying to tag opponents; once the singer has tagged an opponent, they must flee the field and try to avoid being whipped.

=== Zum-zum ===
There are two players on each team in this traditional game of Myanmar. The defenders can not tackle the raider in this variant; they can only attempt to tag the raider before the raider escapes. If the raider escapes without executing or receiving a tag, then the game continues with the other side raiding.
