= Glossary of kabaddi terms =

This is a glossary of terminology used in kabaddi.

== A ==
=== All out ===
An 'all out' occurs when all seven defenders have been declared out, with an 'all in' then occurring with all seven defenders returning to the court. By PKL rules, two bonus points are scored by the raiding team for an 'all out'. (Note: The 'all out' is also known as a Lona.)

== C ==
=== Center ===
The center is the defender who stands in the middle of the defensive formation, when it has seven players lined up from side of the field to the other.

=== Corner ===
The corners are the two defenders who stand nearest to the corners of the field.

=== Cover ===
The covers are the two defenders who stand next to the corner defenders.

== D ==
=== Dash ===
A dash is executed when a defender runs at and pushes a raider towards the periphery of the field, aiming to score a point by forcing the raider out-of-bounds.

=== Do-or-Die raid ===
After two consecutive empty raids, the third raid is deemed a 'do-or-die raid'; if the do-or-die raid also ends up as an empty raid, then the defending team scores a point and the raider is out.

=== Dubki ===
The dubki is a move executed by a raider in which the raider ducks low and dives underneath and through the legs of defender(s) who are between the raider and the midline, and then runs past the midline.

== E ==
=== Empty raid ===
An empty raid is a raid where no points are scored.

== G ==
=== Golden raid ===
A type of tiebreaker in which the baulk line is treated as equivalent to the bonus line.

== I ==
=== In ===
The ins are the two defenders who stand next to the center defender.

== L ==
=== Lobby ===
The lobby areas are extensions of the court on either side of the field perpendicular to the midline. They are only considered part of the field during each raid once the raider has made contact with a defender.

=== Lona ===
See all out.

== P ==
=== Pro Kabaddi League ===
The Indian Pro Kabaddi League (PKL) is the biggest kabaddi league in the world. It introduced several rule changes and innovations to the sport.

== R ==
=== Raid ===
An instance of the offensive team sending a raider into the defensive team's half of the field.

=== Raider ===
The designated player on the offensive team whose goal is to enter the other team's half of the field, tag some defenders, and then return safely.

== S ==
=== Struggle ===
A struggle is initiated during each raid when contact is first made between the raider and a defender, with the lobbies then becoming part of the field.

== T ==
=== Tag ===
A tag occurs when a raider uses any part of his body to touch any part of a defender's body.

=== Technical point ===
A technical point is scored by a team when an opponent steps out of the court before making contact with a player on the first team.
