= Kabaddi World Cup (International Kabaddi Federation) =

International kabaddi competition

- Sport: Standard style Kabaddi
- Founded: 2004; 22 years ago
- First season: M: 2004; W: 2012
- Most recent season: M: 2016; W: 2025
- Administrator: International Kabaddi Federation
- No. of teams: 12
- Region: Global
- Most recent champions: M: India (3rd title); W: India (2nd title)
- Most titles: M: India (3 titles); W: India (2 titles)

The Kabaddi World Cup, is an indoor international kabaddi tournament conducted by the International Kabaddi Federation (IKF). It follows the standard style (indoors on a rectangular court) and is contested by men's and women's national teams. The format involves a round-robin group stage, including 5 teams in 2 pools, with the first and second place finishers of each group progressing to the semi-finals.

The IKF World Cup men's tournament has been held three times and the women's event has been held only once. The tournaments were all held in India. In all cases, the events were won by the India team, and the team from Iran has always been the runner-up. The men's events were in 2004 in Mumbai, in 2007 in Panvel, and in 2016 in Ahmedabad. The women's tournament was held in 2012 in Patna.

With the return of international kabaddi post the COVID-19 pandemic and the 2022 Asian Games, the IKF announced the resumption of the Men's World Cup in January 2025 and Women's World Cup in 2026, with the men's and women's events taking place every alternate year thereafter. It was later reported that the men's event may take place later in the year, possibly in Bangladesh, while the women's event will take place in November 2025 in Bangladesh.

== Editions and results ==
=== Men ===
Year	Host	Final			Third place	
Year	Host	Champions	Score	Runner-up	Third place	
2004	(India); Mumbai	India	55–27	Iran	Bangladesh	Canada
2007	(India); Panvel	India	29–19	Iran	Bangladesh	Japan
2016	(India); Ahmedabad	India	38–29	Iran	South Korea	Thailand
2025	Not held					

=== Women ===
Year	Host	Final			Third place	
Year	Host	Champions	Score	Runner-up	Third place	
2012	(India); Patna	India	25–19	Iran	Japan	Thailand
2025	(Bangladesh); Dhaka	India	35–28	Chinese Taipei	Iran	Bangladesh

== Medal table ==
=== Men ===
Rank	Nation	Gold	Silver	Bronze	Total
1	India	3	0	0	3
2	Iran	0	3	0	3
3	Bangladesh	0	0	2	2
4	Canada	0	0	1	1
4	Japan	0	0	1	1
4	South Korea	0	0	1	1
4	Thailand	0	0	1	1
Totals (7 entries)		3	3	6	12

=== Women ===
Rank	Nation	Gold	Silver	Bronze	Total
1	India	2	0	0	2
2	Iran	0	1	1	2
3	Chinese Taipei	0	1	0	1
4	Bangladesh	0	0	1	1
4	Japan	0	0	1	1
4	Thailand	0	0	1	1
Totals (6 entries)		2	2	4	8

== Team results ==
Team	(India) 2004	(India) 2007	(India) 2016	Total
Afghanistan		GS		1
Argentina			GS	1
Australia			GS	1
Bangladesh	SF	SF	GS	3
Canada	SF			1
England	QF	GS	GS	3
Germany	GS			1
India	1st	1st	1st	3
Iran	2nd	2nd	2nd	3
Italy		GS		1
Japan	QF	SF	GS	3
Kenya			GS	1
Malaysia	GS	QF		2
Nepal	GS	QF		2
Poland			GS	1
South Korea	GS	GS	SF	3
Sri Lanka		QF		1
Thailand	GS	QF	SF	3
Turkmenistan		GS		1
United States			GS	1
West Indies	GS	GS		2
Total	12	14	12	

=== Women ===
Team	(India) 2012	(Bangladesh) 2025	Total
Bangladesh	QF	SF	2
Canada	GS		1
Germany		GS	1
Chinese Taipei	GS	2nd	2
India	1st	1st	2
Indonesia	QF		1
Iran	2nd	SF	2
Italy	GS		1
Japan	SF		1
Kenya		GS	1
Malaysia	GS		1
Mexico	GS		1
Nepal	GS	GS	2
Poland		GS	1
South Korea	QF		1
Sri Lanka	QF		1
Thailand	SF	GS	2
Turkmenistan	GS		1
Uganda		GS	1
United States	GS		1
Zanzibar		GS	1
Total	16	11	22
