= Sakshi Kumari =

Indian kabaddi player (born 1996)

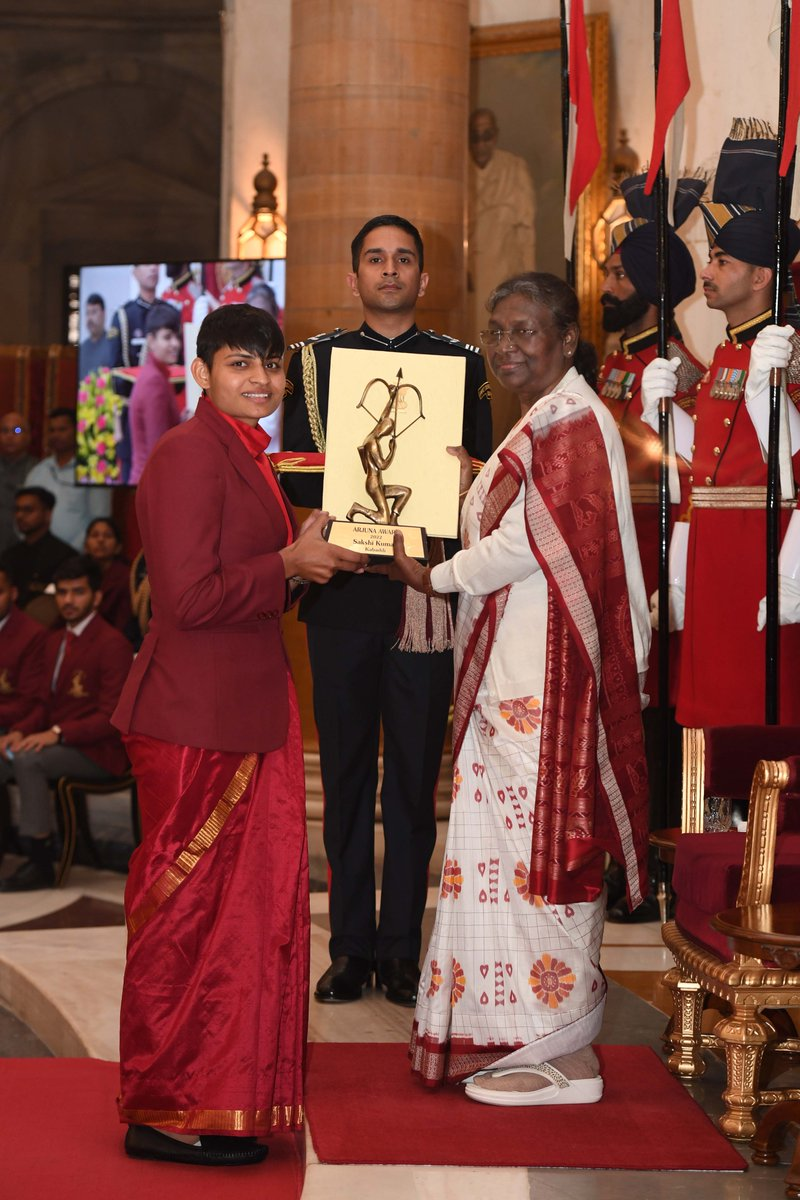
- President Droupadi Murmu confers Arjuna Award, 2022 on Ms. Sakshi Kumari for her achievements in Kabaddi

Sport
- Sport: Kabaddi
Medal record
Women's Kabaddi
Representing India
Asian Games
Gold medal – first place	2022 Hangzhou	Team
Silver medal – second place	2018 Jakarta Palembang	Team
South Asian Games
Gold medal – first place	2019 Kathmandu	Team

Sakshi Kumari (born 29 November 1996) is an Indian kabaddi player. In 2022, she was awarded the Arjuna Award.

== Career ==
Kumari was a member of the kabaddi teams that won the silver medal at the 2018 Asian Games, and the gold at the 2019 South Asian Games.
