= Thailand national kabaddi team =

Thai men's national kabaddi team

Thailand
- Association: Thailand Kabaddi Association
- Confederation: Asian Kabaddi Federation (AKF)
- Head Coach: Ravindra Shetty
- Captain: Thanongsak Srihera
- Most caps: Khomsan Thongkam

World Cup
- 3 (first in 2004)
- (bronze) 3rd (2016)

Asian Games
- 5 (first in 1998)
- (bronze) 3rd (2026)

Asian Championship
- Unknown (first in Unknown)
- Unknown
Medal record
Event	1st	2nd	3rd
World Cup	0	0	1
Asian Games	0	0	1
Asian Indoor and Martial Arts Games	0	0	1
Asian Beach Games	0	0	1
Total	0	0	4

The Thailand national kabaddi team represents Thailand in international men's kabaddi competitions. The team won the bronze medal at the 2026 Asian Games, Thailand's first men's medal in the sport at the Games since kabaddi was introduced in 1990.

== History ==
Thailand first entered kabaddi at the 1998 Asian Games, which it hosted in Bangkok, finishing sixth. The team finished third at the 2016 Kabaddi World Cup and third at the 2013 Asian Indoor Games.

Coach Ravindra Shetty, who began working with the team after the 2022 Asian Games, led the men's team at the 2026 Asian Games in Aichi–Nagoya. Captained by Thanongsak Srihera, Thailand won three of its four Group B matches, beating Nepal 59–48, Malaysia 65–23 and Pakistan 48–45, and losing 83–27 to Iran, to reach the knockout stage at the Asian Games for the first time. In the semi-final on 25 September at the Tokai Citizens Gymnasium Thailand lost 66–28 to India, which secured the bronze medal, as both beaten semi-finalists were awarded bronze.

== Tournament records ==
=== Asian Games ===
Year	Rank	Pld	W	D	L	PF	PA	PD
China 1990	Did not enter	–	–	–	–	–	–	–
Japan 1994	Did not enter	–	–	–	–	–	–	–
Thailand 1998	6th	6	1	0	5	98	258	-160
Korea 2002	Did not enter	–	–	–	–	–	–	–
Qatar 2006	Withdrew							
China 2010	Did not enter	–	–	–	–	–	–	–
Korea 2014	5th	3	1	0	2	94	153	-59
Indonesia 2018	9th	4	0	0	4	102	181	-79
China 2022	7th	4	1	0	3	124	184	-60
Japan 2026	Third place	5	3	0	2	227	265	-38
Total	5/10	22	6	0	16	645	1041	-396

==== 2026 Asian Games results ====
Date	Round	Opponent	Score
21 September 2026	Group B	Nepal	59–48
22 September 2026	Group B	Malaysia	65–23
23 September 2026	Group B	Pakistan	48–45
24 September 2026	Group B	Iran	27–83
25 September 2026	Semi-final	India	28–66

=== World Cup ===
Year	Rank	Pld	W	D	L
India 2004	Group stage	3	1	0	2
India 2007	Quarter-finals	4	2	0	2
India 2016	3rd place	6	4	0	2
Total	3/3	13	7	0	6

=== Asian Beach Games ===
Year	Rank	Pld	W	D	L
Indonesia 2008	3rd place	5	2	0	3
Oman 2010	Preliminaries round	4	2	0	2
China 2012	Preliminaries round	3	1	0	2
Total	3/3	11	5	0	7

=== Asian Indoor Games ===
Year	Rank	Pld	W	D	L
Incheon 2013	3rd place	5	2	0	3
Total	1/1	5	2	0	3

== Current squad ==
The following squad was named for the 2026 Asian Games.

Player
Thanongsak Srihera (Captain)
Chayaphon Kamunee
Rattanakon Yotsungnoen
Supawit Somrat
Phetchui Saharat
Jittiang Khomkrit
Nopphadon Pontaisong
Nithiphat Phikhrao
Somboon Kaewkampon
Pramot Saising
Theeradet Chaisit

== See also ==
- Thailand women's national kabaddi team
- Sport in Thailand
