= South Korea women's national kabaddi team =

South Korean women's national kabaddi team

South Korea
- Association: Korea Kabaddi Association
- Confederation: Asian Kabaddi Federation (AKF)
- Captain: Kim Hee-jeong

World Cup
- 1 (first in 2012)
- Quarter-finals (2012)

Asian Games
- 4 (first in 2010)
- 5th (2010, 2014, 2018)

The South Korea women's national kabaddi team (also known as the Republic of Korea women's national kabaddi team) represents South Korea in international women's kabaddi competitions. Governed by the Korea Kabaddi Association, the team has played at four of the five women's kabaddi tournaments at the Asian Games, with fifth place its best finish, and at the 2012 Women's Kabaddi World Cup.

== History ==
South Korea first played women's kabaddi at the 2010 Asian Games in Guangzhou, finishing fifth, and again finished fifth as hosts of the 2014 Asian Games in Incheon. In the 2012 Women's Kabaddi World Cup in Patna the team reached the quarter-finals. It won two of its three matches at the 2018 Asian Games in Jakarta, again finishing fifth.

At the 2022 Asian Games, held in Hangzhou in 2023, South Korea lost all three of its Group A matches, including 56–23 to India and 35–24 to Chinese Taipei, and finished seventh. The team did not enter the women's tournament at the 2026 Asian Games in Aichi–Nagoya, where eight nations competed in India, Iran, Japan, Bangladesh, Sri Lanka, Thailand, Chinese Taipei and Nepal; the South Korean men's team took part and finished ninth. South Korea also did not enter the 2025 Women's Kabaddi World Cup in Dhaka.

== Squad ==
The following squad was last listed for the team. South Korea did not send a women's team to the 2026 Asian Games.

Name
Lee Hyun-jeong
Moon Kyung-seo
Woo Hee-jun
Kim Hee-jeong (Captain)
Park Ji-yi
Lee Seul-ji
Yoon Yu-ri
Kim Ji-young
Choi Da-hye
An Myeong-eun
Jo Hyun-a

== Tournament records ==
=== Asian Games ===
Year	Rank	Pld	W	D	L	PF	PA	PD
China 2010	5th	3	1	0	2	40	75	-35
South Korea 2014	5th	2	0	0	2	44	77	-33
Indonesia 2018	5th	3	2	0	1	92	87	+5
China 2022	7th	3	0	0	3	70	134	-64
Japan 2026	Did not enter							
Total	4/5	11	3	0	8	246	373	-127

=== World Cup ===
Year	Rank	Pld	W	D	L
India 2012	Quarter-finals	4	2	0	2
Bangladesh 2025	Did not enter				
Total	1/2	4	2	0	2
