= Kabaddi =

Contact team sport

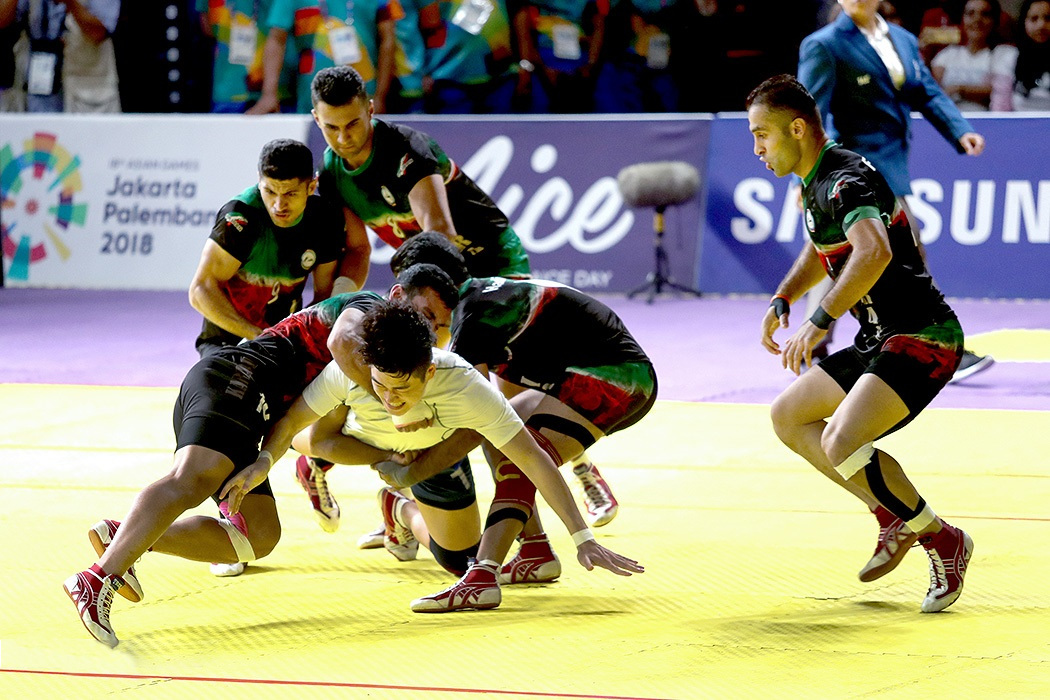
- Kabaddi being played at the 2018 Asian Games
- Highest governing body: International Kabaddi Federation; World Kabaddi
- First played: Modern: 1921, India

Characteristics
- Contact: Yes, full-contact
- Team members: 7 per side
- Mixed-sex: No
- Type: Outdoor
- Equipment: No
- Venue: Kabaddi court
- Glossary: Glossary of kabaddi terms

Presence
- Country or region: Worldwide, majorly in Asia
- Olympic: 1936 (Demonstration sport)
- World Championships: Kabaddi World Cup (IKF); Kabaddi World Cup (World Kabaddi); Kabaddi World Cup (circle style)

Kabaddi (Note: Pronunciation: /kəˈbædi/, or /ˈkʌbədi/) is a contact sport played between two teams of seven players each. During the game, a lone member of one team ("raider") enters the opposite half of the court and tries to tag members of the opposition team ("defenders") without being tackled. In a single raid, often lasting a maximum 30 seconds, points are awarded for successful tags if the raider does not get out, while defenders earn a point if the raider is tackled, goes out of bounds or timed out. Tagged or tackled players temporarily step out of the game and can be revived when the team scores points. Raids alternate between the teams throughout the game.

There are several variations of the sport though the two major forms are the standard style, played on a rectangular court, that is part of international competitions such as the Asian Games, and circle style (also called Punjabi kabaddi), played on a circular field.

Though it is more popular in Asia, it is played in several countries around the world. Although evidence of a sport similar to modern kabaddi can be found in ancient Indian texts, the rules of modern kabaddi were formalised in the 1920s in India and the game was popularised as a competitive sport in the late 20th century.

It is included among the traditional games of South Asia and is the national sport of Bangladesh, the state sport of several Indian states and is listed as an intangible cultural heritage by the Malaysian government.

== Etymology and names ==
The origin of the word "kabaddi" is unclear. An often cited etymology is from the Tamil words "kai" and "pidi" meaning "to hold hands". Other cited etymologies include those from Kannada, Hindi, Bengali and Punjabi. According to medical anthropolgist Joseph Alter:

The meaning of the term is ambiguous, but it seems to be comprised of strongly aspirated consonants that require clear lip and tongue movement so that it is clearly apparent if the raider is breathing while the word is being spoken. With somewhat more interpretive license, however, Laxmikant Pande provides the following etymology for the term:
"The word is composed of two parts 'ka' and 'baddi'. Since 'ka' is the first letter of the alphabet we can take it to mean 'beginning' or 'start.' 'Baddi' is associated, by way of its derivation from the term barbarana [roar], with the idea of 'coming to life. Thus we can say that the fundamental meaning of kabaddi to begin living. It is a command to begin life, learn the art of living and loudly proclaim an answer to the question - how should life be lived?"

The sport is known by various names in different parts of the Indian subcontinent, such as: chedugudu in Andhra Pradesh, ha-du-du in Bengal, bhavatik in Maldives, jabarjang in Punjab, gudu in Sri Lanka, sadugudu in Tamil Nadu, and hu-tu-tu in West India. In Thailand it is known as theechub.

Multiple traditional names exist for the sport throughout Iran, including zo in Khorasan, Golestan and Mazandaran; shirin-dodo in Gilan; ti-ti in Khuzestan; and kabaddi in Sistan and Baluchestan.

== History ==
=== Ancient era ===
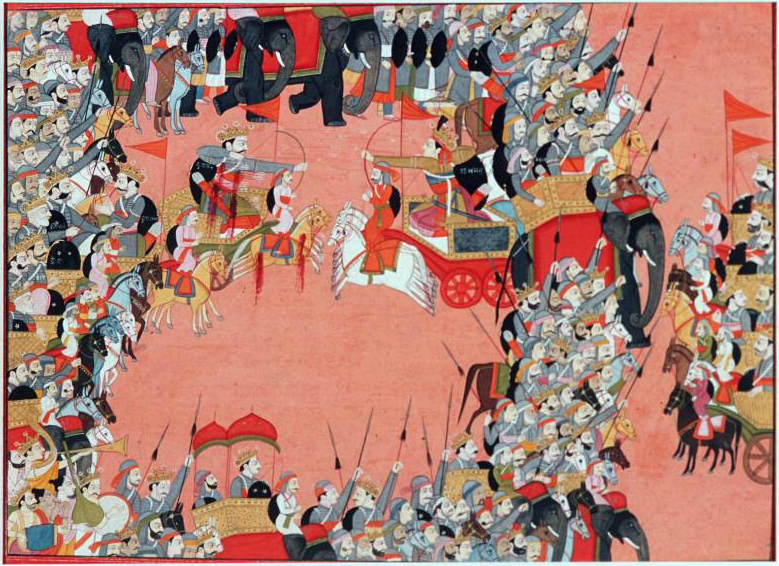
In the Mahabharata, Abhimanyu raids the Kauravas, which exhibits similarities to the modern day kabaddi c. 1803

The exact origin of the sport has been unclear, though it probably originated in the Indian subcontinent, about four thousand years ago. It may have originated in prehistoric times, when humans formed groups to protect themselves from predators and to hunt animals or perhaps as a way of demonstrating bravery. According to Ronojoy Sen kabaddi originated during the Vedic period (between 1500 and 500 BCE). Some form of the sport is claimed to have been played for physical exercise in the vedic schools of ancient India.

In the ancient Indian epic Mahabharata, during the Kurukshetra War, Abhimanyu raids the Kaurava army and gets trapped in the Chakravyuha formation, which exhibits similarities to the modern day kabaddi. Krishna and Siddhartha Gautama are said to have played an ancient form of the sport.

There are also accounts of kabaddi having originated in ancient Tamilakam, or in Persia.

=== Modern era ===
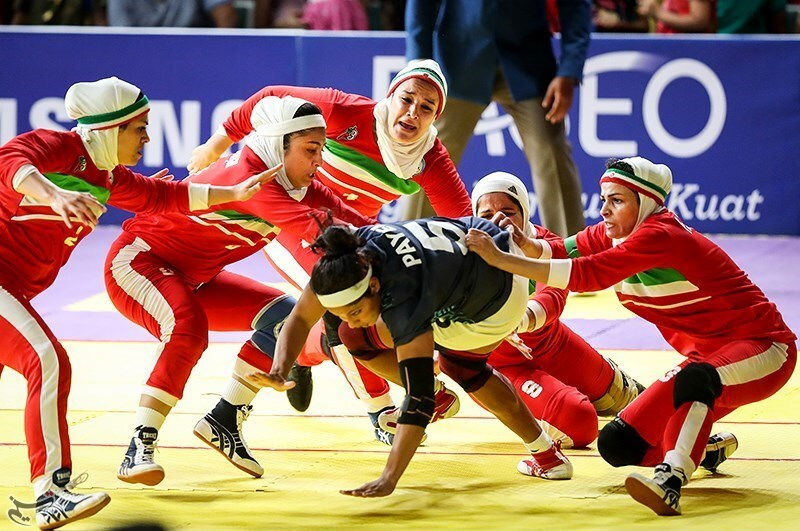
Modern day women's kabaddi at the 2018 Asian Games

Modern kabaddi originated in the 1920s in India. The first set of rules were formulated in present-day Maharashtra in 1921, and were modified further in 1923, when the first national tournament was held in Baroda. It was a demonstration sport at the 1936 Summer Olympics in Berlin where it was demonstrated by an Amravati-based sports organisation. In 1938, it was included as part of the All-India Olympic Championships (later National Games) held in Calcutta. The All India Kabaddi Federation was established in 1950 and started organizing annual national tournaments for men from 1952 and women from 1955. Kabaddi was a demonstration sport in the inaugural edition of the Asian Games held in New Delhi in 1951. The popularity of the sport grew in the later 20th century in South Asia.

The Amateur Kabaddi Federation of India was formed in 1972 and kabaddi was designated the national sport of Bangladesh in the same year. With the establishment of the Asian Amateur Kabaddi Federation, the first Asian Kabaddi Championship was organized in 1980. The sport was played at the South Asian Games held at Dhaka later that year. It became part of the official programme at the 1990 Asian Games held in Beijing. These developments helped to formalise the sport, as it began to be played on synthetic surfaces, having been traditionally played on muddy surfaces. The International Kabaddi Federation as established in 2004, and organised the first Kabaddi World Cup later that year in Mumbai. The first Asian Women's Kabaddi Championship was held at Hyderabad in 2005, and the women's event was included in the Asian Games programme for the first time in 2010. In the 2010s, several franchise based kabaddi leagues such as the Pro Kabaddi League began to be organized, which led to increased interest in the sport.

== Gameplay and rules ==
=== Play area ===
Though kabaddi was traditionally played outdoors, competitive matches are held on padded mats. The dimensions of the court vary according to gender and age groups. It measures 10 by 13 m (33 by 43 ft) in the case of men and 8 by 12 m (26 by 39 ft) for women. Sub-junior level (under 16) games are played on 11 by 8 m (36 by 26 ft) courts. The court is bound by four outher boundary lines and is divided into two equal halves by a midline. The lines are stipulated to be 3 to 5 cm (1.2 to 2.0 in) thick. A 4 m (13 ft) clearance area is left on all sides of the playing area. On both the side boundaries, a 1 m (3 ft 3 in) area is designated as lobby area, which forms part of the playing field. On each side, there are two parallel lines drawn on the far end of the court. The baulk line is located about 3.75 m (12.3 ft) from the midline for men and 3 m (9.8 ft) for women, and the bonus line lies 1 m (3 ft 3 in) beyond the baulk line.

=== Players, equipment, and officials ===
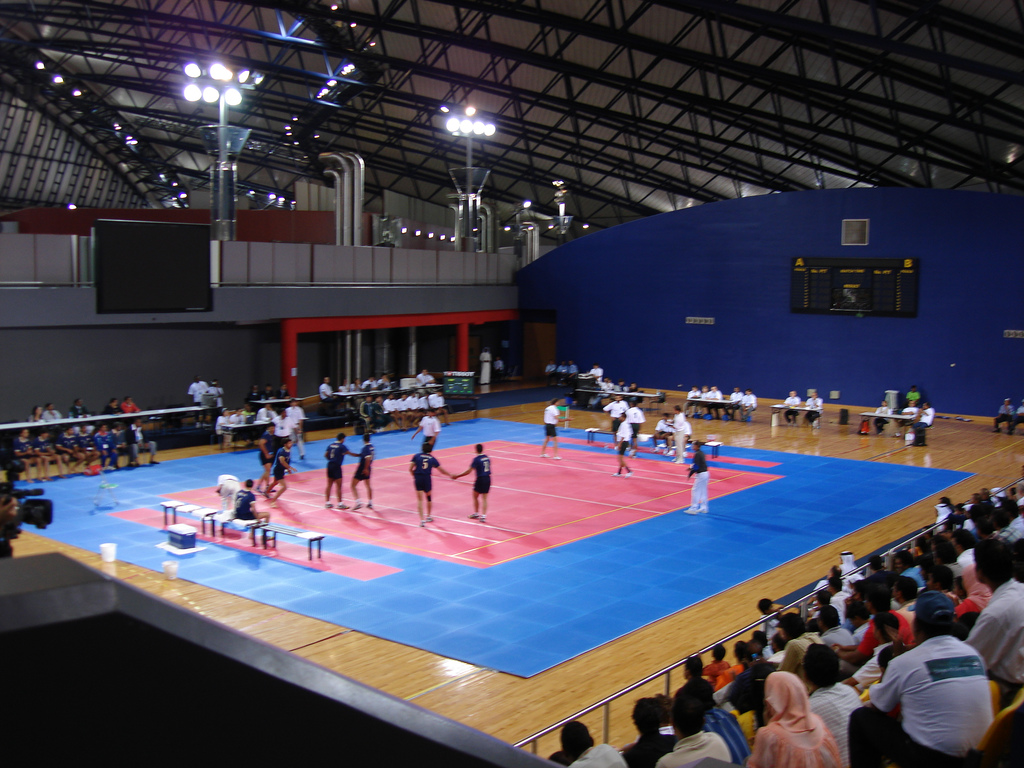
Match played on a standard kabaddi court at the 2006 Asian Games

In the standard version of kabaddi, two teams of seven members each compete against each other. The teams also have three to five substitute players. The teams occupy opposing sides on a field, and at any given time, one member of a team ("raider") ventures into the opposition half to take on a team of "defenders". Players are required to wear a shirt, shorts, and footwear. The players have unique numbers that are mentioned on both the back and front of the shirt. Players are barred from having long nails or wearing any ornaments during the match. Players are not allowed to apply any slippery substances such as oil on their bodies.

Five substitutions are allowed during the match generally effected during time outs. The same player can be re-substituted any number of times within the overall limit. Players who are suspended from the match or not on court cannot be substituted for another player.

The match officials include a referee, two umpires, one scorer, and two assistant scorers. The officials have a stipulated dress code of shirts, black trousers, and white shoes, and carries other necessary equipment like whistle, cards, and timers. The game is officiated by the two umpires, whose decision may be overruled by the referee is special circumstances. The referee is also responsible for the coin toss at the start of the match, time keeping, and announcement of substitution of players. The scorer records the score, and informs the referee and the umpires on the same. The assistant scorers are responsible for tracking whether any player goes out of the field of play and the order in which the players get on to the mat after being outed.

=== Gameplay ===
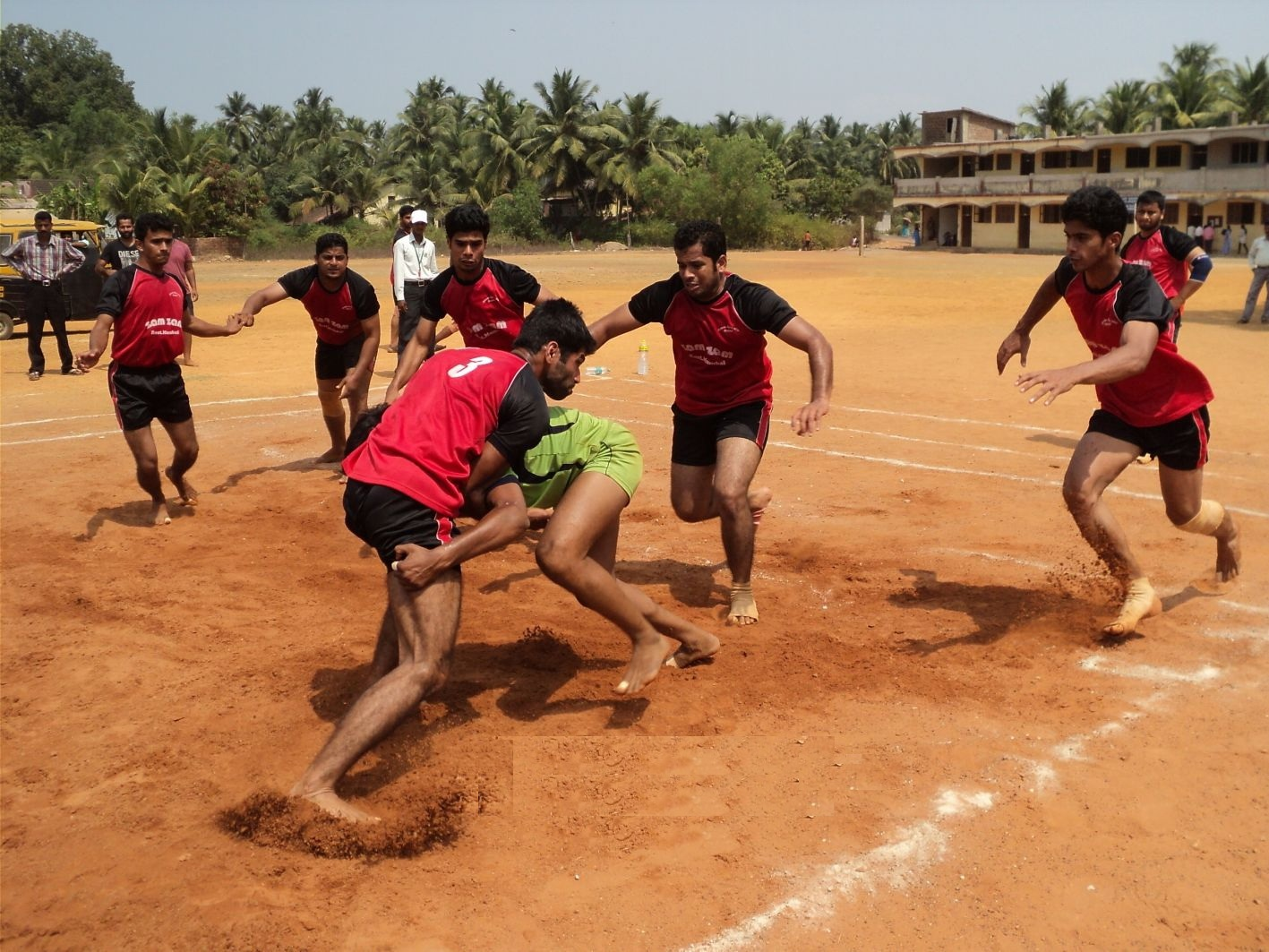
Opposition "defenders" trying to tackle a "raider" during gameplay

During each play, known as a "raid", a player from the attacking side ("raider"), runs into the opposing team's side of the court. During a raid, the raider attempts to tag as many defenders as possible and tries to return to their half of the field without being tackled. A point is scored for each defender tagged; tags can be made with any part of the raider's body by touching any part of the defender's body. If the raider steps beyond the bonus line marked in the defending team's territory when there are six or more opposing players, they earn an additional point known as a bonus point. The bonus point is only scored if the raider's trailing foot is in the air while they step over the line. While raiding, the raider must chant kabaddi (known as "cant"), confirming to referees that the raid is completed on a single breath without inhaling.

If the raider is successfully stopped ("tackle") or pushed out of the playing area by the defenders, the raider is out and the opposing team earns a point instead. The raider is also declared out if there is no contact with any of the defenders and the baulk line is not crossed. Any of the defenders going outside the playing area during a raid are declared out and withdrawn immediately. If the raider fails to cant or if more than one raider enter the opposition half, a technical foul is declared and the opposition is awarded a point. If an outed player is involved in a tackle, or if the defenders pull the hair or clothing of the raider, it is considered invalid, and the raider is not declared out. When the raider makes contact with any of the opposition players, the lobby areas on either side comes into play, which can be used by the raider or the defending team.

The raider and the defenders, if declared out, are taken out of the gameplay. They can be revived for each point a team scores from subsequent gameplay in the same order they went out. However, bonus or penalty points do not revive players. If a team gets all seven players on the opposing team out ("All Out"), they earn two additional points and then all the seven opposition players re-enter in the game.

=== Duration and tie-breaking methods ===
A typical match consists of two halves with a five minute interval in between. Each half consists of 20 minutes in case of men and 15 minutes for women. The teams switch sides on the court at half time. The match time clock ticks only when the gameplay is on. Teams can take two 30-minute time outs in each half, which can be requested by the manager of any of the players to the match officials.

The team with the most points at the end of the match is declared the winner. If the teams are tied, points can be split during group stage matches, or a tie-breaker can be held to determine the winner. In the tie-breaker, both the teams are allowed to have all seven players on the mat at all the times. The baulk line is considered as both baulk and bonus line for scoring purposes. Five raids are allowed for each team, with a different raider nominated for each of the raids. If the score remains level after the five raids, a coin toss is made to determine which team gets a chance to get on a golden raid. The team which scores the first point during the golden raid wins the match.

=== Misconduct ===
Players are cautioned with a green card, suspended temporarily using a yellow card, and dismissed from the game with a red card.

Players are cautioned with a green card, suspended temporarily using a yellow card, and dismissed from the game with a red card. Cards can be issues to the players on field, those on the bench, or the officials of the team. The referee or the umpires can issue verbal warnings before issuing cards. A foul occurs when a violation is committed. Violations include teams taking more than five seconds to start a raid, a member of the opposition preventing the raider from starting a raid, a raider covering the mouth, a defender choking the raider or using prohibited or violent methods to tackle the raider. Remonstrating with the officials, using bad language against the officials or other players, making obscene gestures or pointing fingers are considered offences. Managers or officials can be cautioned if they try to give instructions during the gameplay or confront the officials in an aggressive manner.

The umpires may punish the misconduct by issuing penalty points and issue a card. A green card is issued as a warning, and a yellow card results in a player's suspension from the game for two minutes. The two minutes are considered only the player is on the field, and the clock is paused, when the player gets out, to be resumed later. The red card results in a player's suspension from the game, and probably the tournament in case of certain or repeated offences. Two green cards automatically translate to a yellow, and two yellows lead to a red card.

== Variations ==
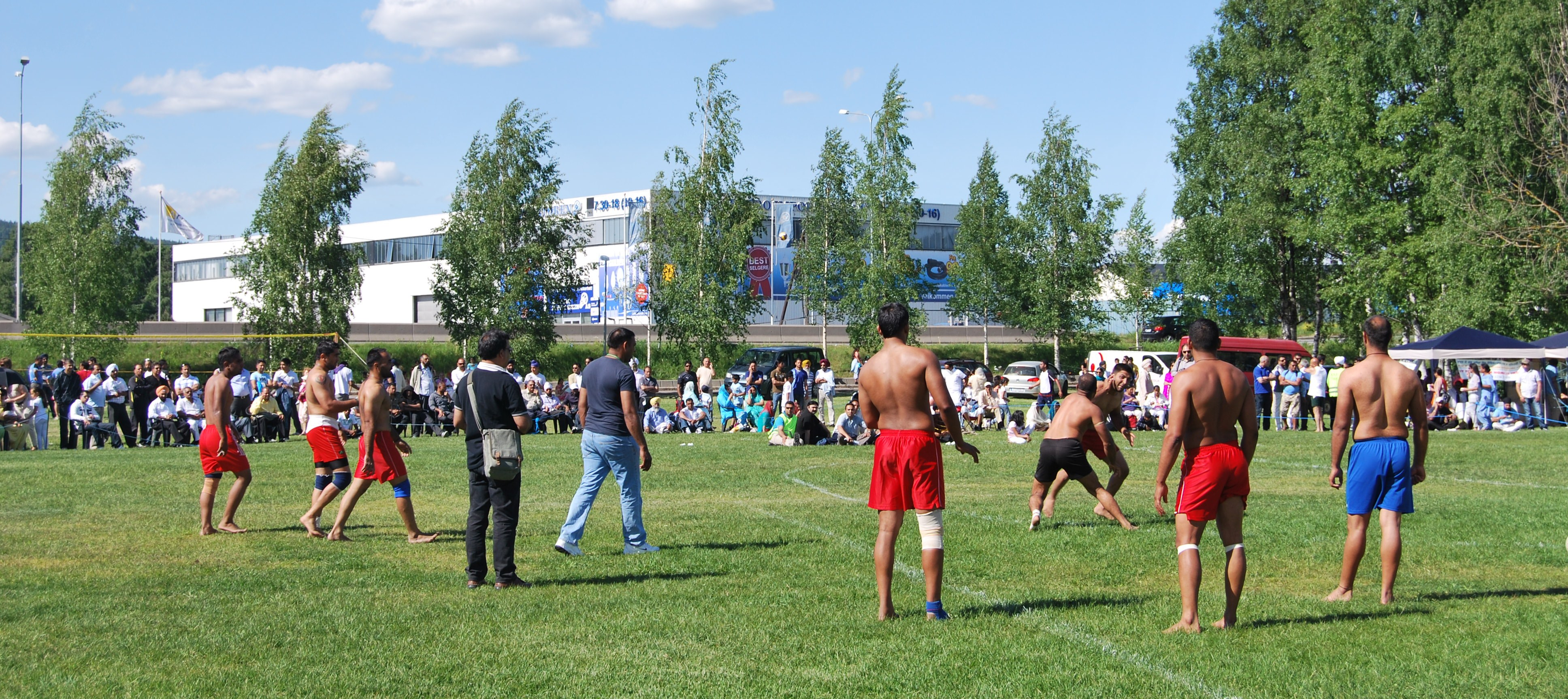
A Punjabi (circle style) kabaddi match

There are three recognized forms of kabaddi played in India. In Sarjeevani or Surjeevani Kabaddi, one player is revived against one player of the opposite team who is out. In the Gaminee style, there is no revival rule, and the players step back in only after all the seven members of a team are out. In Punjabi kabaddi, also known as Amar or circle style kabaddi, is a variation that is played on a circular pitch of a diameter of 22 m (72 ft). There is a smaller center circle of 6 m (20 ft) diameter, known as the "pala". Only one raider and a defender is allowed to compete during a single raid with outs earning a point for either team and no players are sent out.

Beach kabaddi is variant played by two teams of four players on levelled ground of sand without wearing footwear, and competed at the Asian Beach Games. An indoor variant is played with two teams of five players in a smaller court at certain competitions such as the Asian Indoor and Martial Arts Games. Goongi Kabbadi is a version of the kabaddi that is played without a standard court.

== Governing bodies ==
The International Kabaddi Federation was the first global body established to govern the sport in 2004. Another kabaddi organisation named the World Kabaddi Federation was founded in 2003 and formally incorporated in 2004. A different organisation called World Kabaddi was founded in 2018. The Asian Kabaddi Federation governs the sport in Asia and is affiliated to the Olympic Council of Asia.

== International competitions ==
=== World Cup ===
Participating nations in the first Kabaddi World Cup in 2004

The first Kabaddi World Cup was organized by the International Kabaddi Federation in 2004. Further World Cups were organized at Panvel in 2007 and at Ahmedabad in 2016. The first Women's Kabaddi World Cup was held in Patna in 2012 and a further event was hosted at Dhaka in 2025. The Indian men's and women's teams have won all the editions of the World Cup held so far. Iran has finished runners-up in all the men's edition with Iran and Chinese Taipei finishing as runners-up in the 2012 and 2025 women's editions respectively. The first edition of the Junior Kabaddi World Cup was held in Kish Island in 2019 and the second edition in Urmia in 2023. Iran beat Kenya in the first edition, in which India did not take part. India won the second edition beating Iran in the final.

World Kabbadi organizes a separate Kabaddi World Cup for both men and women. The first edition was held in 2019 at Melaka and the second edition was held in 2025 at East Midlands. The Indian teams won all the editions of the tournament held so far.

=== Asian Games ===
Kabaddi was played as a demonstration event at the first Asian Games in 1951, and again in 1982, before becoming a medal event for the first time in 1990. The women's event was included in the Asian Games programme in 2010. The Indian team has won seven of the eight gold medals in the men's tournament and three of the four gold medals in the women's event at the Asian Games. The only exception was in 2018, when Iran won both the men's and women's kabaddi competition.

=== Continental Championships ===
The first Asian Kabaddi Championship was held in Calcutta 1980. The ninth edition of the men's event was played in Busan in 2023, in which India won its eighth title. The first edition of the Women's Asian Kabaddi Championship was held in Hyderabad in 2005. The sixth edition was held in Tehran in 2025, in which India won its fifth title.

The first edition of European Kabaddi Championship was held in Scotland in 2019 with Poland beating Netherlands in the final. Poland retained the title by beating hosts Cyprus in the final of the second edition in 2021. In the third edition held in Italy in 2023, Poland beat England in the final.

=== Others ===
Kabaddi was first played at the South Asian Games in 1985. The Indian team has won all the seven editions of the event in the South Asian Games.

Six teams featured in the inaugural edition of the Kabaddi Masters was held in Dubai in June 2018. India won the tournament by defeating Iran in the final.

== Domestic competitions ==
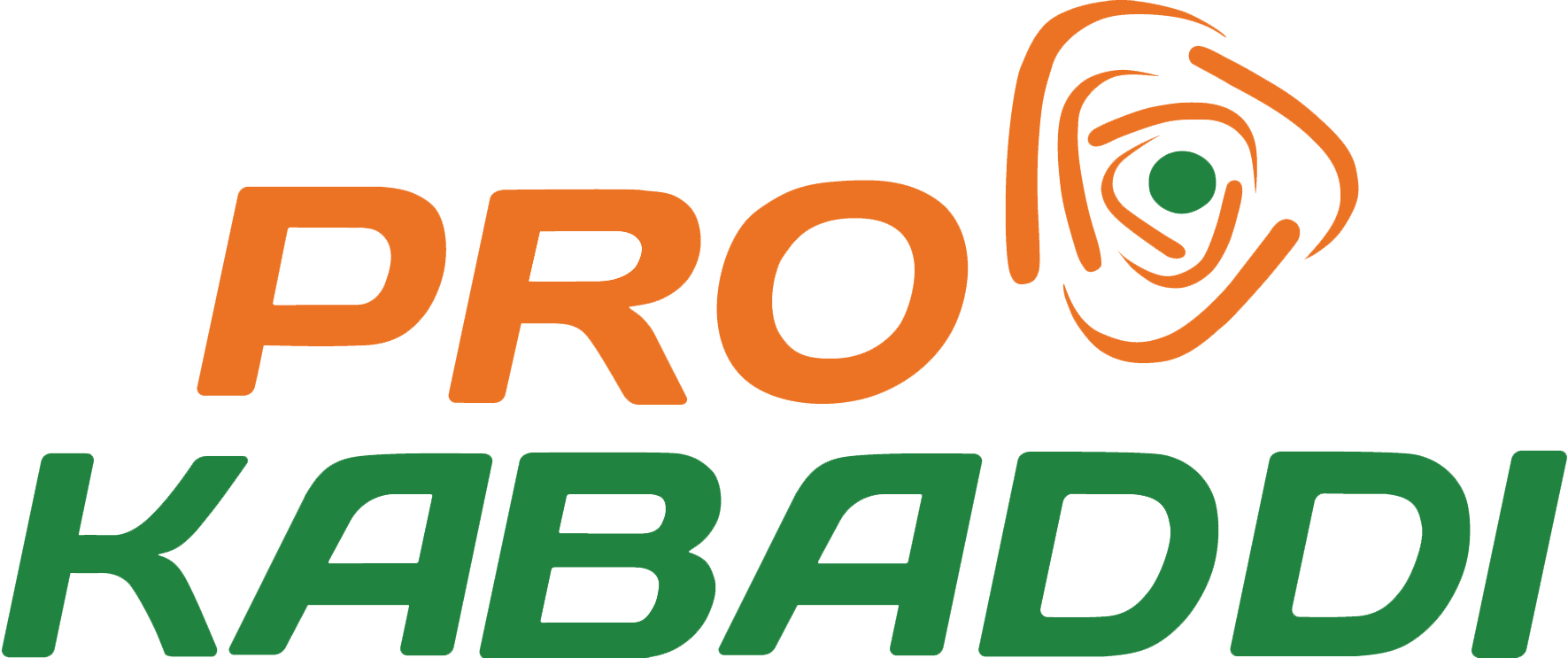
Logo of the Pro Kabaddi League, a franchise based tournament in India

The Pro Kabaddi League is a franchise based tournament representing various cities in India that was established in 2014. The league started with eight franchises and expanded to 12 ahead of the fifth season in 2017. The league has generated significant television viewership in India. Apart from standard rules, the league has special rules to encourage scoring. After two consecutive empty raids, the next raid becomes a do-or-die raid, where the raider must score or be declared out. A raid scoring 3+ points is called a super raid, while a tackle by three or fewer defenders is known as a super tackle, earning an extra point. A raider scoring 10+ points in a match achieves a Super Ten, and a defender making five successful tackles achieves a High Five—both earning an extra point for the team.

The first and only edition of the Super Kabaddi League, a franchise based tournament in Pakistan, was organized in May 2018. The inaugural edition of the Indo International Premier Kabaddi League, another franchise based league in India, was organized in May 2019 at Pune. The first edition of the Nepal Kabaddi League was organized in January 2025. The Yuva Kabaddi Series is a franchise based junior-category kabaddi tournament, first held in Jaipur in June 2022. A further three editions were held in the same season across India.

== Patronage ==
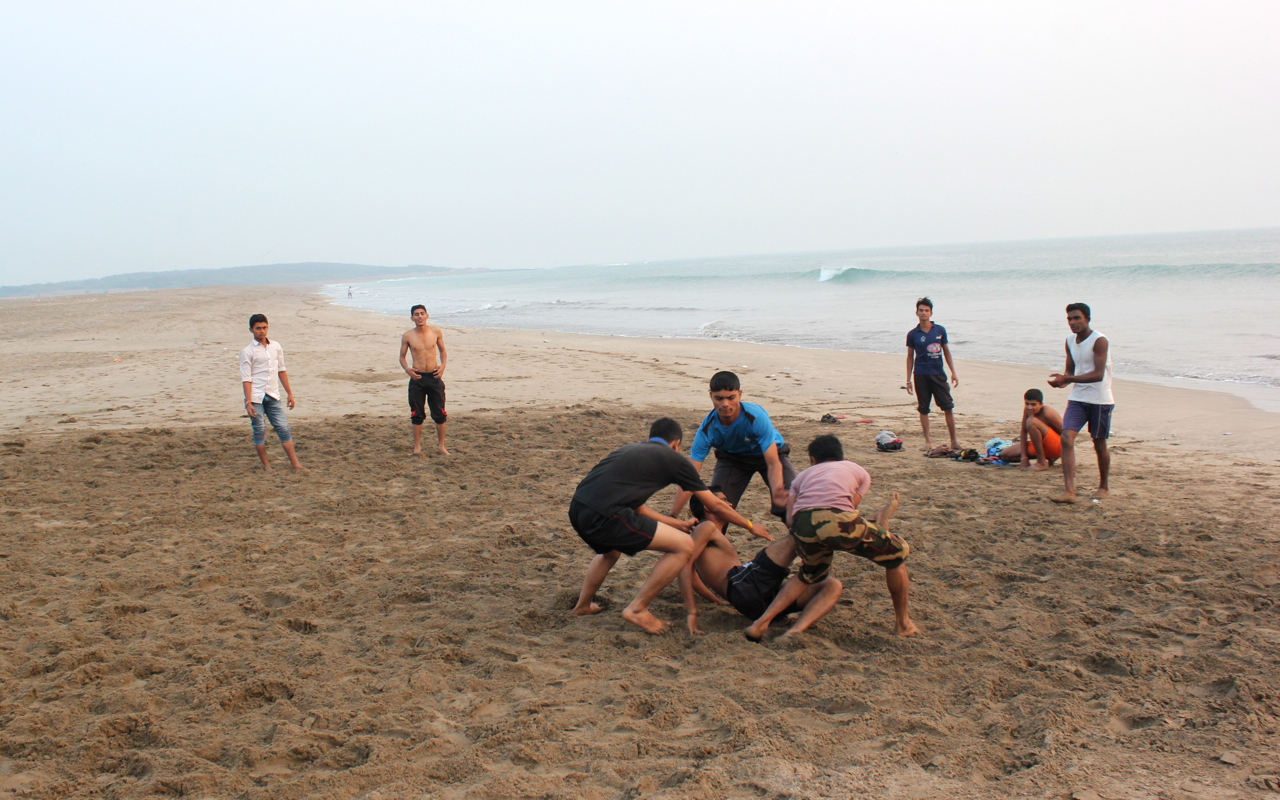
Kabbadi played on a beach in India

While kabaddi has a history spanning thousands of years in the Indian subcontinent and Persia, it was mainly played as rural sport. It was a source of entertainment and cohesion among the rural populace. As per journalist John Arlott, the sport reflected a philosophy of "simple living and high thinking". Kabaddi further lost its importance during the British Raj in India, when native sports were disregarded and other sports such as cricket and association football were promoted. This continued into the later half of the 20th century, with the lack of sporting facilities for kabaddi and little attention from the government and media.

The standardization of rules and international events have improved the visibility of the sport since the 1990s. The sport has seen a revival of sorts in the 21st century, and is one of the most popular and viewed sports in the subcontinent. Kabaddi is the national sport of Bangladesh, and several states of India including Andhra Pradesh, Bihar, Maharashtra, Punjab, Tamil Nadu, and Telangana. In 2012, the National Inventory of Intangible Cultural Heritage in Malaysia listed kabaddi as the country's intangible cultural heritage.

While it has been popular in South Asia and Iran, it has been popularized across several other countries across the world. It has been introduced by the South Asian diaspora to the United Kingdom and practised by the British Army. In the 21st century, other Asian nations like South Korea and Taiwan has seen success in international competitions. It has also been played in several nations worldwide including in Africa, Americas, Europe, and Oceania.

== See also ==
- Capture the flag
- Jallikattu
- Kho kho
- Tag (game)
- Galah panjang and Gobak sodor
- Sumo
