= International Kabaddi Federation =

Governing body of kabaddi

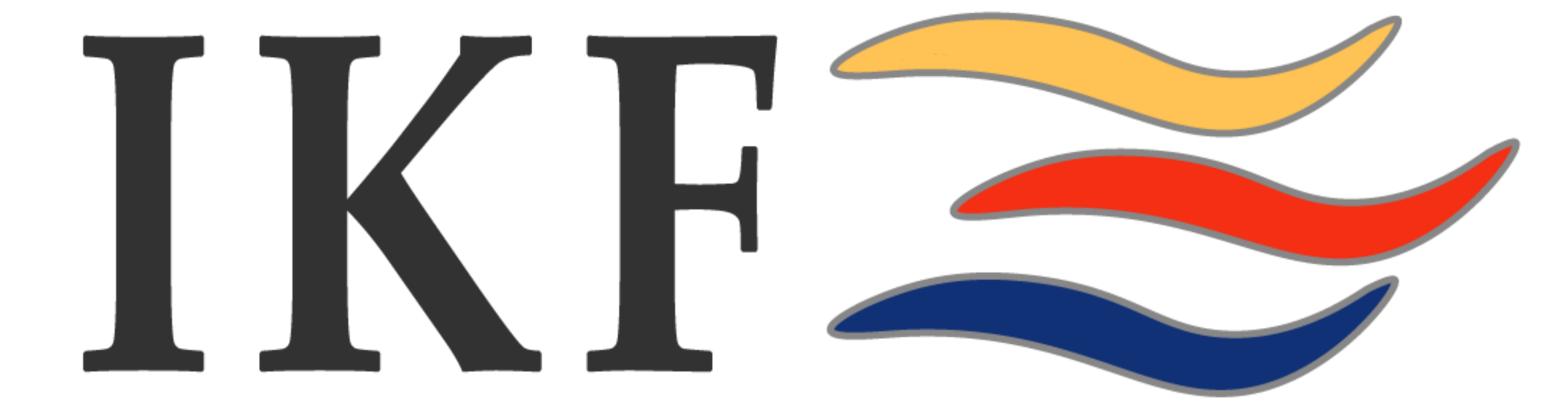
- Sport: Kabaddi
- Membership: 33 members
- Abbreviation: IKF
- Founded: January 2004; 22 years ago
- Location: Jaipur, India
- President: Vinod Kumar Tiwari (India)
- Secretary: Sathasivam Munisami (Malaysia)
- Other key staff: Tulsi Thapa (Treasurer)

The International Kabaddi Federation (IKF), is an international governing body of the sport of kabaddi. Its membership comprises 31 national associations. The federation was formed in 2004 and was founded by Ashish Pachori from India who served as the first president.

== Members ==
The following countries are members of the International Kabaddi Federation:

Affiliated countries
Country	Continent	Association	Men's team	Women's team
Afghanistan	Asia	Afghanistan National Kabaddi Federation	✓	✗
Argentina	America	Argentina Kabaddi Association	✓	✗
Australia	Oceania	Australia Kabaddi Association	✓	✗
Bangladesh	Asia	Bangladesh Kabaddi Federation	✓	✓
China	Asia	The People's Republic of China Luoyang Kabadi Association	✓	✗
Denmark	Europe	Kabaddi Federation of Denmark	✓	✓
England	Europe	England Kabaddi Union	✓	✓
Hong Kong	Asia	Hong Kong China Kabaddi Association	✓	✓
India	Asia	Amateur Kabaddi Federation Of India	✓	✓
Indonesia	Asia	Indonesia Kabaddi Federation	✓	✓
Iran	Asia	Kabaddi Federation of I.R. Iran	✓	✓
Japan	Asia	Japan Kabaddi Association	✓	✓
Kenya	Africa	Kenya Kabaddi Association	✓	✓
Kuwait	Asia	Kuwait Kabaddi Association	✗	✗
Malaysia	Asia	Kabaddi Association of Malaysia	✓	✓
Nepal	Asia	All Nepal Kabaddi Association	✓	✓
Oman	Asia	Oman Kabaddi Association	✓	✗
Pakistan	Asia	Pakistan Kabaddi Federation	✓	✓
South Korea	Asia	Korea Kabaddi Association	✓	✓
Sri Lanka	Asia	Sri Lanka Kabaddi Federation	✓	✓
Chinese Taipei	Asia	Chinese Taipei Kabaddi Federation	✓	✓
Thailand	Asia	Sports Kabaddi Association of Thailand	✓	✓
Uzbekistan	Asia	UZB Kabaddi Association	✓	✓ (2026)
Kazakhstan	Asia	KAZ Kabaddi Association	✓	✓ (2026)
Turkmenistan	Asia	Turkmenistan Kabaddi Association	✓	✓
United States	America	US Kabaddi Federation	✓	✓
Provisional affiliated countries
Algeria	Africa	Algerian Kabaddi Sport Federation	✗	✗
Iraq	Asia	Iraq Kabaddi Federation	✓	✓
Lebanon	Asia	Lebanese Kabaddi Committee	✗	✗
Netherlands	Europe	Nederland Kabaddi Bond	✗	✗
Palestine	Asia	Palestine Kabaddi Committee	✗	✗
Poland	Europe	Poland Kabaddi Association	✓	✓
Senegal	Africa	Senegal Kabaddi Federation	✗	✗
Singapore	Asia	Kabaddi Association Central SG	✗	✗
Syria	Asia	Kabaddi Federation of Syrian Arab Republic	✗	✗
Sweden	Europe	Swedish Kabaddi Federation	✓	✗
Uganda	Africa	Kabaddi Federation of Uganda	✓	✓

== Tournaments ==
Kabaddi
World	Kabaddi World Cup; Junior Kabaddi World Cup
Asia	Asian Games; Asian Kabaddi Championship
Africa	Africa Kabaddi Championship
Europe	European Kabaddi Championship
Beach kabaddi
World	World Beach Kabaddi Championship
Asia	Asian Beach Games
Europe	European Beach Kabaddi Championship
Indoor kabaddi
Asia	Asian Indoor and Martial Arts Games

== Current champions ==
Standard kabaddi	Men's	Women's
IKF World Cup	India (2016)	India (2025)
Asian Games	India (2026)	India (2026)
Asian Championship	India (2023)	India (2025)
Africa Championship	Kenya (2024)	Uganda (2023)
European Championship	Poland (2023)	Italy (2023)
Junior World Cup	India (2023)	
Beach kabaddi	Men's	Women's
World Championship	Iran (2024)	
Asian Beach Games	Pakistan (2016)	India (2016)
European Beach Championship	Poland (2024)	Poland (2024)
Indoor kabaddi	Men's	Women's
Asian Indoor and Martial Arts Games	(2013)	(2013)
