= List of Asian Games medalists in kabaddi =

This is the complete list of Asian Games medalists in Kabaddi from 1990 to 2026.

== Men ==
Games	Gold	Silver	Bronze
1990 Beijing	India (IND); Raju Bhavsar; Krishan Kumar Godara; Anil Kumar; Ashan Kumar; Tirath Raj; S. Rajarathinam; Ashok Shinde; Hardeep Singh; Randhir Singh	Bangladesh (BAN); Nazir Ahmed; Shah Alam; Amjad Hossain; Rabiul Islam; Tariqul Islam; Abul Qasem	Pakistan (PAK); Nisar Ahmed; Pervaiz Ahmed; Muhammad Farooq; Muhammad Hussain; Mubashir Iqbal; Muhammad Mansha; Sultan Mehmood; Talat Mehmood; Abdul Razaq; Muhammad Sarwar; Rana Saif Ullah; Tahir Waheed
1994 Hiroshima	India (IND); Kasinatha Baskaran; Perumal Ganesan; Raju Ghule; A. K. Munivenkatappa; Biswajit Palit; Tirath Raj; S. Rajarathinam; Ashok Shinde; Avtar Singh; Surender Singh	Bangladesh (BAN)	Pakistan (PAK); Zubair Ahmed; Muhammad Akram; Tahir Afzal Gujjar; Mehmood Hussain; Muhammad Zahoor Joya; Wasim Khan; Hassan Raza Khawaja; Muhammad Mansha; Sultan Mehmood; Muhammad Sarwar
1998 Bangkok	India (IND); C. Honappa; Sanjeev Kumar; Virender Kumar; Muruga Nantham; Biswajit Palit; B. C. Ramesh; Rambir Singh Sangwan; Kiranpal Singh; Ram Mehar Singh; Shamsher Singh	Pakistan (PAK); Zubair Ahmed; Muhammad Akram; Muhammad Ghulam; Badshah Gul; Mehmood Hussain; Iqbal Javid; Abdul Majeed; Muhammad Mansha; F. Muhammad; Muhammad Sarwar	Bangladesh (BAN)
2002 Busan	India (IND); Ram Mehar Singh; Shamsher Singh; Neer Gulia; B. C. Ramesh; Manpreet Singh; Ramesh Kumar; Sunder Singh; Jagdish Kumble; B. C. Suresh; K. K. Jagdeesha; Dinesh Kumar; Sanjeev Kumar	Bangladesh (BAN); Badsha Miah; Jahidul Islam; Deolwar Hossain; Ziaur Rahman; Rabiul Islam; Al Mamun; Tariqul Islam; Kamal Hossain; Bashir Ahmad; Mollah Tauhidul Islam; Enamul Haque; Rezaul Islam	Pakistan (PAK); Muhammad Mansha; Tariq Hussain; Zubair Ahmed; Muhammad Akram Shakar; Mukhtar Ahmed; Muhammad Latif; Badshah Gul; Muhammad Saleem; Noor Akbar; Muhammad Akram
2006 Doha	India (IND); Navneet Gautam; Vikash Kumar; Suresh Kumar; Dinesh Kumar; Manpreet Singh; Ramesh Kumar; Rakesh Kumar; Sukhvir Singh; Naveen Kumar; Gaurav Shetty; Pankaj Shirsat; Rajeev Kumar Singh	Pakistan (PAK); Muhammad Akram; Nasir Ali; Badshah Gul; Wajid Ali; Waseem Sajjad; Muhammad Arshad; Maqsood Ali; Rahat Maqsood; Naveel Akram; Abrar Khan; Faryad Ali; Faisal Qadeer	Bangladesh (BAN); Ziaur Rahman; Badsha Miah; Kazi Yunus Ahmed; Md Abdur Rouf; Kamal Hossain; Abu Salah Musa; Md Mizanur Rahman; Mozammal Haque; Bozlur Rashid; Mosharrof Hossain; Abul Kalam; Razu Ahmed
2010 Guangzhou	India (IND); Jasmer Singh; Samarjeet; Anup Kumar; Jeeva Kumar; Manjeet Chhillar; Sonu Narwal; Rakesh Kumar; Jasmer; Navneet Gautam; Kaptan Singh; Nitin Ghule; Jagdeep Singh	Iran (IRI); Reza Kamali Moghaddam; Morteza Shahidi; Nasser Roumiani; Fazel Atrachali; Meisam Abbasi; Mehdi Mousavi; Siamak Rezagholi; Abouzar Mohajer; Mehdi Safaeian; Kianoush Naderian; Ebad Dalili; Mostafa Nodehi	Japan (JPN); Kokei Ito; Hiromi Takahashi; Kazuhiro Takano; Terukazu Nitta; Kazuaki Murakami; Masayuki Ota; Ryota Nakajima; Ryokei Kushige; Yoji Kawai; Yudai Yamagishi; Taiki Nama; Masayuki Shimokawa
2010 Guangzhou	India (IND); Jasmer Singh; Samarjeet; Anup Kumar; Jeeva Kumar; Manjeet Chhillar; Sonu Narwal; Rakesh Kumar; Jasmer; Navneet Gautam; Kaptan Singh; Nitin Ghule; Jagdeep Singh	Iran (IRI); Reza Kamali Moghaddam; Morteza Shahidi; Nasser Roumiani; Fazel Atrachali; Meisam Abbasi; Mehdi Mousavi; Siamak Rezagholi; Abouzar Mohajer; Mehdi Safaeian; Kianoush Naderian; Ebad Dalili; Mostafa Nodehi	Pakistan (PAK); Nasir Ali; Wajid Ali; Waseem Sajjad; Muhammad Khalid; Muhammad Arshad; Ibrar Hussain; Abrar Khan; Maqsood Ali; Abdul Mukhtar; Atif Waheed; Akhlaq Hussain; Muhammad Ali
2014 Incheon	India (IND); Jasvir Singh; Anup Kumar; Manjeet Chhillar; Ajay Thakur; Rakesh Kumar; Gurpreet Singh; Navneet Gautam; Surjeet Kumar; Parveen Kumar; Nitin Madane; Surjeet Singh Narwal; Rajaguru Subramanian	Iran (IRI); Fazel Atrachali; Meraj Sheikh; Mehdi Mousavi; Hadi Oshtorak; Gholam Abbas Korouki; Farhad Rahimi; Mohammad Maghsoudloo; Meisam Abbasi; Hadi Tajik; Reza Kamali Moghaddam; Abolfazl Maghsoudloo; Meisam Ghajar	South Korea (KOR); Kim Ki-dong; Eom Tae-deok; Park Hyun-il; Lee Jang-kun; Hong Dong-ju; Yook Sang-min; Ahn Hwan-gi; Jung Kwang-soo; Kim Seong-ryeol; Seo Dea-ho; Kim Gyung-tae; Heo Youn-chan
2014 Incheon	India (IND); Jasvir Singh; Anup Kumar; Manjeet Chhillar; Ajay Thakur; Rakesh Kumar; Gurpreet Singh; Navneet Gautam; Surjeet Kumar; Parveen Kumar; Nitin Madane; Surjeet Singh Narwal; Rajaguru Subramanian	Iran (IRI); Fazel Atrachali; Meraj Sheikh; Mehdi Mousavi; Hadi Oshtorak; Gholam Abbas Korouki; Farhad Rahimi; Mohammad Maghsoudloo; Meisam Abbasi; Hadi Tajik; Reza Kamali Moghaddam; Abolfazl Maghsoudloo; Meisam Ghajar	Pakistan (PAK); Nasir Ali; Muhammad Kashif; Atif Waheed; Wajid Ali; Waseem Sajjad; Ibrar Hussain; Muhammad Rizwan; Aqeel Hassan; Muhammad Nisar; Muhammad Shahbaz Anwar; Shabbir Ahmed; Hassan Ali
2018 Jakarta–Palembang	Iran (IRI); Fazel Atrachali; Mohammad Esmaeil Nabibakhsh; Mohammad Amin Nosrati; Hadi Oshtorak; Mohammad Mallak; Mohammad Ghorbani; Esmaeil Maghsoudloo; Meisam Abbasi; Mohsen Maghsoudloo; Abouzar Mohajer; Abolfazl Maghsoudloo; Hamid Mirzaei	South Korea (KOR); Lee Dong-geon; Eom Tae-deok; Ok Yong-joo; Lee Jang-kun; Hong Dong-ju; Kim Dong-gyu; Park Chan-sik; Jo Jae-pil; Kim Seong-ryeol; Park Hyun-il; Kim Gyung-tae; Ko Young-chang	India (IND); Monu Goyat; Rahul Chaudhari; Mohit Chhillar; Ajay Thakur; Girish Maruti Ernak; Pardeep Narwal; Sandeep Narwal; Raju Lal Choudhary; Rishank Devadiga; Rohit Kumar; Deepak Niwas Hooda; Gangadhari Mallesh
2018 Jakarta–Palembang	Iran (IRI); Fazel Atrachali; Mohammad Esmaeil Nabibakhsh; Mohammad Amin Nosrati; Hadi Oshtorak; Mohammad Mallak; Mohammad Ghorbani; Esmaeil Maghsoudloo; Meisam Abbasi; Mohsen Maghsoudloo; Abouzar Mohajer; Abolfazl Maghsoudloo; Hamid Mirzaei	South Korea (KOR); Lee Dong-geon; Eom Tae-deok; Ok Yong-joo; Lee Jang-kun; Hong Dong-ju; Kim Dong-gyu; Park Chan-sik; Jo Jae-pil; Kim Seong-ryeol; Park Hyun-il; Kim Gyung-tae; Ko Young-chang	Pakistan (PAK); Nasir Ali; Waseem Sajjad; Muhammad Nadeem; Muhammad Rizwan; Abid Hussain; Waqar Ali; Tahseen Ullah; Usman Zada; Mudassar Ali; Kashif Razzaq; Muhammad Imran; Hassan Raza
2022 Hangzhou	India (IND); Nitesh Kumar; Aslam Inamdar; Nitin Rawal; Parvesh Bhainswal; Surjeet Singh Narwal; Vishal Bhardwaj; Naveen Kumar; Sunil Kumar; Pawan Sehrawat; Arjun Deshwal; Akash Shinde; Sachin Tanwar	Iran (IRI); Fazel Atrachali; Mohammad Esmaeil Nabibakhsh; Milad Jabbari; Hamid Mirzaei; Reza Mirbagheri; Amir Hossein Bastami; Alireza Mirzaeian; Mohammad Reza Shadloo; Moein Shafaghi; Mohammad Kazem Nasseri; Mohammad Reza Kaboudarahangi; Amir Mohammad Zafardanesh	Pakistan (PAK); Mudassar Ali; Tahseen Ullah; Sajjad Shaukat; Akhlaq Ahmed; Muzammil Zafar; Umair Khan; Usman Ahmed; Muhammad Imran; Waqar Ali; Mazhar Iqbal; Muhammad Safian
2022 Hangzhou	India (IND); Nitesh Kumar; Aslam Inamdar; Nitin Rawal; Parvesh Bhainswal; Surjeet Singh Narwal; Vishal Bhardwaj; Naveen Kumar; Sunil Kumar; Pawan Sehrawat; Arjun Deshwal; Akash Shinde; Sachin Tanwar	Iran (IRI); Fazel Atrachali; Mohammad Esmaeil Nabibakhsh; Milad Jabbari; Hamid Mirzaei; Reza Mirbagheri; Amir Hossein Bastami; Alireza Mirzaeian; Mohammad Reza Shadloo; Moein Shafaghi; Mohammad Kazem Nasseri; Mohammad Reza Kaboudarahangi; Amir Mohammad Zafardanesh	Chinese Taipei (TPE); Huang Tzu-ming; Li Hao-wei; Lin I-ching; Chang Chia-ming; Li Jyun-jie; Yu Hao-cheng; Wu Wei-jheng; Wang Lunchu; Huang Jih-hung; Chang Chung-mao; Chen Zheng-wei; Tsai Chung-hao
2026 Aichi–Nagoya	India (IND); Rahul Sethpal; Gaurav Khatri; Pawan Sehrawat; Ashu Malik; Arjun Deshwal; Sumit Sangwan; Jaideep Dahiya; Ayan Lohchab; Ankit Jaglan; Sunil Kumar; Devank Dalal; Aslam Inamdar	Iran (IRI); Fazel Atrachali; Mohammad Reza Shadloui; Amir Hossein Ejlali; Omid Khojasteh; Ali Samadi; Amir Hossein Bastami; Alireza Mirzaeian; Mohammad Esmaeil Nabibakhsh; Reza Mirbagheri; Amirmohammad Zafar Danesh; Amirreza Aliakbari; Amirhossein Taghipour	Thailand (THA); Chayaphon Kamunee; Rattanakon Yotsungnoen; Supawit Somrat; Saharat Phetchui; Khomkrit Jittiang; Nopphadon Pontaisong; Nithiphat Phikhrao; Somboon Kaewkampon; Tanongsak Srihera; Pramot Saising; Theeradet Chaisit; Wisat Wuttari
2026 Aichi–Nagoya	India (IND); Rahul Sethpal; Gaurav Khatri; Pawan Sehrawat; Ashu Malik; Arjun Deshwal; Sumit Sangwan; Jaideep Dahiya; Ayan Lohchab; Ankit Jaglan; Sunil Kumar; Devank Dalal; Aslam Inamdar	Iran (IRI); Fazel Atrachali; Mohammad Reza Shadloui; Amir Hossein Ejlali; Omid Khojasteh; Ali Samadi; Amir Hossein Bastami; Alireza Mirzaeian; Mohammad Esmaeil Nabibakhsh; Reza Mirbagheri; Amirmohammad Zafar Danesh; Amirreza Aliakbari; Amirhossein Taghipour	Chinese Taipei (TPE); Chen Zheng-wei; Chuang Chia-ming; Li Jyun-jie; Lin Po-ting; Cai Ruei-chen; Su Hsiang-chih; Chang Chung-mao; Jin Wu Fu-kai; Wang Lun-chu; Peng Xian-ya; Tsai Chung-hao; Yeh Jiunn-ming

== Women ==
Games	Gold	Silver	Bronze
2010 Guangzhou	India (IND); Snehal Sampat Salunkhe; Kavitha Selvaraj; V. Tejeswini Bai; Sanahanbi Devi; Pooja Sharma; Kavita; Manisha; Deepika Henry Joseph; Shermi Ulahannan; Mamatha Poojary; Kalyani Marella; Smita Kumari	Thailand (THA); Alisa Limsamran; Namfon Kangkeeree; Chonlada Chaiprapan; Kamontip Suwanchana; Treeveeraporn Tongnun; Janjira Panprasert; Atchara Puangngern; Nuchanart Maiwan; Sutarat Thonghun; Yaowaret Nitsara; Wattakan Kammachot; Naleerat Ketsaro	Bangladesh (BAN); Shahnaz Parvin Maleka; Maleka Parvin; Farzana Akhter Baby; Juni Chakma; Kazi Shahin Ara; Rupali Akhter; Sharmin Sultana Rima; Dolly Shefali; Fatema Akhter Poly; Kochi Rani Mondal; Hena Akhter; Ismat Ara Nishi
2010 Guangzhou	India (IND); Snehal Sampat Salunkhe; Kavitha Selvaraj; V. Tejeswini Bai; Sanahanbi Devi; Pooja Sharma; Kavita; Manisha; Deepika Henry Joseph; Shermi Ulahannan; Mamatha Poojary; Kalyani Marella; Smita Kumari	Thailand (THA); Alisa Limsamran; Namfon Kangkeeree; Chonlada Chaiprapan; Kamontip Suwanchana; Treeveeraporn Tongnun; Janjira Panprasert; Atchara Puangngern; Nuchanart Maiwan; Sutarat Thonghun; Yaowaret Nitsara; Wattakan Kammachot; Naleerat Ketsaro	Iran (IRI); Soheila Solbi; Fatemeh Momeni; Saeideh Maghsoudloo; Maliheh Miri; Shilan Sharezouli; Ghazal Khalaj; Farideh Zarifdoust; Zahra Masoumabadi; Samira Shabani; Salimeh Abdollahbakhsh; Marzieh Eshghi; Sedigheh Jafari
2014 Incheon	India (IND); Kavita Thakur; Kavita Devi; V. Tejeswini Bai; Abhilasha Mhatre; Pooja Thakur; Priyanka Pilaniya; Anita Mavi; Lakshman Singh Jayanthi; Sumitra Sharma; Mamatha Poojary; Sushmita Pawar; Kishore Dilip Shinde	Iran (IRI); Salimeh Abdollahbakhsh; Zahra Masoumabadi; Marzieh Eshghi; Maliheh Miri; Sedigheh Jafari; Ghazal Khalaj; Farideh Zarifdoust; Mojgan Zare; Hengameh Bourghani; Sahar Ilat; Saeideh Jafari; Tahereh Tirgar	Bangladesh (BAN); Shahnaz Parvin Maleka; Kazi Shahin Ara; Sharmin Sultana Rima; Farzana Akhter Baby; Fatema Akhter Poly; Juni Chakma; Shila Akhter; Rupali Akhter; Suma Akhter; Mita Khatun; Tuktuki Akhter; Azmira Khatun Dola
2014 Incheon	India (IND); Kavita Thakur; Kavita Devi; V. Tejeswini Bai; Abhilasha Mhatre; Pooja Thakur; Priyanka Pilaniya; Anita Mavi; Lakshman Singh Jayanthi; Sumitra Sharma; Mamatha Poojary; Sushmita Pawar; Kishore Dilip Shinde	Iran (IRI); Salimeh Abdollahbakhsh; Zahra Masoumabadi; Marzieh Eshghi; Maliheh Miri; Sedigheh Jafari; Ghazal Khalaj; Farideh Zarifdoust; Mojgan Zare; Hengameh Bourghani; Sahar Ilat; Saeideh Jafari; Tahereh Tirgar	Thailand (THA); Alisa Limsamran; Namfon Kangkeeree; Chonlada Chaiprapan; Kamontip Suwanchana; Alisa Thongsook; Sai Jaemjaroen; Atchara Puangngern; Nuchanart Maiwan; Nuntarat Nuntakitkoson; Rattana Rueangkoet; Wattakan Kammachot; Naleerat Ketsaro
2018 Jakarta–Palembang	Iran (IRI); Ghazal Khalaj; Mahboubeh Sanchouli; Farideh Zarifdoust; Saeideh Jafari; Raheleh Naderi; Roya Davoudian; Samira Atarodian; Fatemeh Karami; Azadeh Seidi; Sedigheh Jafari; Zahra Karimi; Zahra Abbasi	India (IND); Sakshi Kumari; Kavita Thakur; Shalini Pathak; Randeep Kaur Khehra; Payel Chowdhury; Sonali Vishnu Shingate; Priyanka Negi; Ritu Negi; Sayali Sanjay Keripale; Usha Rani Narasimhaiah; Manpreet Kaur; Madhu	Thailand (THA); Alisa Limsamran; Namfon Kangkeeree; Nuntarat Nuntakitkoson; Kamontip Suwanchana; Wassana Rachmanee; Saowapa Chueakhao; Atchara Puangngern; Charinda Yindee; Panthida Khamthat; Kannika Munmai; Bencharat Khwanchai; Naleerat Ketsaro
2018 Jakarta–Palembang	Iran (IRI); Ghazal Khalaj; Mahboubeh Sanchouli; Farideh Zarifdoust; Saeideh Jafari; Raheleh Naderi; Roya Davoudian; Samira Atarodian; Fatemeh Karami; Azadeh Seidi; Sedigheh Jafari; Zahra Karimi; Zahra Abbasi	India (IND); Sakshi Kumari; Kavita Thakur; Shalini Pathak; Randeep Kaur Khehra; Payel Chowdhury; Sonali Vishnu Shingate; Priyanka Negi; Ritu Negi; Sayali Sanjay Keripale; Usha Rani Narasimhaiah; Manpreet Kaur; Madhu	Chinese Taipei (TPE); Lin I-min; Lin Yu-fen; Chuang Ya-han; Huang Ssu-chin; Yen Chiao-wen; Chen Yung-ting; Hu Yu-chen; Feng Hsiu-chen; Qin Pei-jyun; Huang Yi-yun; Liao Yu-tzu; Wu Yu-jung
2022 Hangzhou	India (IND); Sushma Sharma; Sakshi Kumari; Pushpa Rana; Nidhi Sharma; Muskan Malik; Priyanka Pilaniya; Ritu Negi; Pooja Hathwala; Pooja Narwal; Jyoti Thakur; Akshima Singh; Snehal Shinde	Chinese Taipei (TPE); Lin I-min; Chuang Ya-hun; Hu Yu-chen; Huang Ssu-chin; Yen Chiao-wen; Ren Ming-xiu; Kang Yung-chiao; Feng Hsiu-chen; Qin Pei-jyun; Huang Yi-yun; Liu Yi-ju; Wu Yu-jung	Iran (IRI); Ghazal Khalaj; Mahboubeh Sanchouli; Zahra Karimi; Saeideh Jafari; Sedigheh Jafari; Roya Davoudian; Farideh Zarifdoust; Mohaddeseh Rajabloo; Fatemeh Khodabandehloo; Fatemeh Mansouri; Maryam Solgi; Raheleh Naderi
2022 Hangzhou	India (IND); Sushma Sharma; Sakshi Kumari; Pushpa Rana; Nidhi Sharma; Muskan Malik; Priyanka Pilaniya; Ritu Negi; Pooja Hathwala; Pooja Narwal; Jyoti Thakur; Akshima Singh; Snehal Shinde	Chinese Taipei (TPE); Lin I-min; Chuang Ya-hun; Hu Yu-chen; Huang Ssu-chin; Yen Chiao-wen; Ren Ming-xiu; Kang Yung-chiao; Feng Hsiu-chen; Qin Pei-jyun; Huang Yi-yun; Liu Yi-ju; Wu Yu-jung	Nepal (NEP); Manmati Bist itu Gurung; Menuka Kumari Rajbanshi; Jayanti Badu; Isha Rai; Arpana Chaudhary; Srijana Kumari Tharu; Sunita Thapa; Rabina Chaudhary; Kalawati Pant; Anuja Kulung Rai; Ganga Ghimire
2026 Aichi–Nagoya	India (IND); Pooja Hathwala; Raj Rani; Sonali Shingate; Pushpa Rana; Bhavna Thakur; Ritu Sheoran; Sanju Devi; Ritu Negi; Manisha Kumari; Pinki Roy; Jyoti Thakur; Nikita Kumari	Iran (IRI); Mahtab Lak; Zahra Astereki; Saniya Naeimi; Hadiseh Varasteh; Nikta Jalalvand; Zahra Khodabandehloo; Zakiyeh Malmali; Aynaz Faramarzi; Atena Madadi; Zahra Karimi; Fereshte Kolagar; Sahar Yari	Nepal (NEP); Rabina Chaudhary; Srijana Kumari Tharu; Ganga Ghimire; Manmati Bist; Jayanti Badu; Khim Maya Khatri; Menuka Kumari Rajbanshi; Mina Nepali; Asma Yadav; Nanu Maya Parajuli; Binita Pandit Chhetri; Manisha Joshi
2026 Aichi–Nagoya	India (IND); Pooja Hathwala; Raj Rani; Sonali Shingate; Pushpa Rana; Bhavna Thakur; Ritu Sheoran; Sanju Devi; Ritu Negi; Manisha Kumari; Pinki Roy; Jyoti Thakur; Nikita Kumari	Iran (IRI); Mahtab Lak; Zahra Astereki; Saniya Naeimi; Hadiseh Varasteh; Nikta Jalalvand; Zahra Khodabandehloo; Zakiyeh Malmali; Aynaz Faramarzi; Atena Madadi; Zahra Karimi; Fereshte Kolagar; Sahar Yari	Chinese Taipei (TPE); Hu Yu-chen; Huang Ssu-chin; Chuang Ya-han; Huang Yi-yun; Chen Shi-han; Ren Ming-xiu; Lin I-min; Yen Chiao-wen; Feng Hsiu-chen; Qin Pei-jyun; Wu Yu-jung; Kang Yung-chiao
