= Kabaddi at the 2014 Asian Games – Women's tournament =

Women at the 2014 Asian Games
- Venue: Songdo Global University Gymnasium
- Date: 28 September – 3 October 2014
- Competitors: 82 from 7 nations

Medalists
gold medal	India
silver medal	Iran
bronze medal	Thailand
bronze medal	Bangladesh

Women's kabaddi at the 2014 Asian Games was held in Songdo Global University Gymnasium, Incheon, South Korea from 28 September to 3 October 2014.

== Squads ==
Bangladesh	Chinese Taipei	India	Iran
Shahnaz Parvin Maleka; Kazi Shahin Ara; Sharmin Sultana Rima; Farzana Akhter Baby; Fatema Akhter Poly; Juni Chakma; Shila Akhter; Rupali Akhter; Suma Akhter; Mita Khatun; Tuktuki Akhter; Azmira Khatun Dola	Hsu Yu-chun; Lin Yu-sang; Tseng I-chieh; Hsiung Yueh-tzu; Lin Yu-fen; Peng Wei-ting; Shih Pin-ju; Yu I-hsuan; Chen Yung-ting; Wu Yu-jung; Liao Yu-tzu; Feng Hsiu-chen	Kavita Thakur; Kavita Devi; V. Tejeswini Bai; Abhilasha Mhatre; Pooja Thakur; Priyanka Pilaniya; Anita Mavi; Lakshman Singh Jayanthi; Sumitra Sharma; Mamatha Poojary; Sushmita Pawar; Kishore Dilip Shinde	Salimeh Abdollahbakhsh; Zahra Masoumabadi; Marzieh Eshghi; Maliheh Miri; Sedigheh Jafari; Ghazal Khalaj; Farideh Zarifdoust; Mojgan Zare; Hengameh Bourghani; Sahar Ilat; Saeideh Jafari; Tahereh Tirgar
Japan	South Korea	Thailand	
Mayuko Takaoka; Yumi Kaneko; Aya Aoki; Asako Tsuzuki; Yukiko Ishizu; Miho Echizenya; Yoko Ota; Yuki Kawakami; Mai Ando; Eri Kasahara	Jo Hyun-a; Ko Eun-byeol; Kim Eung-seo; Kim Ji-young; Nam Hee-jeong; Kim Hee-jeong; Seo Eun-hye; Shin So-min; Yu Hee-na; Yoon Yu-ri; Lee Hyun-jeong; Im Jae-won	Alisa Limsamran; Namfon Kangkeeree; Chonlada Chaiprapan; Kamontip Suwanchana; Alisa Thongsook; Sai Jaemjaroen; Atchara Puangngern; Nuchanart Maiwan; Nuntarat Nuntakitkoson; Rattana Rueangkoet; Wattakan Kammachot; Naleerat Ketsaro	

== Results ==
All times are Korea Standard Time (UTC+09:00)

=== Preliminary ===
==== Group A ====
Pos	Team	Pld	W	D	L	PF	PA	PD	Pts	Qualification
1	India	2	2	0	0	74	44	+30	4	Semifinals
2	Bangladesh	2	1	0	1	48	47	+1	2	Semifinals
3	South Korea	2	0	0	2	44	75	−31	0	

Source: Official website

28 September
9:20

India	29–18 (HT: 22–5)	Bangladesh

Songdo Global University Gymnasium, Incheon

29 September
10:00

Bangladesh	30–18 (HT: 14–11)	South Korea

Songdo Global University Gymnasium, Incheon

30 September
11:00

India	45–26 (HT: 17–10)	South Korea

Songdo Global University Gymnasium, Incheon

==== Group B ====
Pos	Team	Pld	W	D	L	PF	PA	PD	Pts	Qualification
1	Iran	3	3	0	0	114	67	+47	6	Semifinals
2	Thailand	3	2	0	1	90	78	+12	4	Semifinals
3	Japan	3	1	0	2	74	86	−12	2	
4	Chinese Taipei	3	0	0	3	74	121	−47	0	

Source: Official website

28 September
10:10

Thailand	45–23 (HT: 24–9)	Chinese Taipei

Songdo Global University Gymnasium, Incheon

28 September
11:00

Iran	34–23 (HT: 17–12)	Japan

Songdo Global University Gymnasium, Incheon

29 September
11:00

Thailand	20–18 (HT: 12–5)	Japan

Songdo Global University Gymnasium, Incheon

30 September
10:00

Iran	43–19 (HT: 26–11)	Chinese Taipei

Songdo Global University Gymnasium, Incheon

1 October
10:00

Thailand	25–37 (HT: 7–15)	Iran

Songdo Global University Gymnasium, Incheon

1 October
11:00

Japan	33–32 (HT: 15–18)	Chinese Taipei

Songdo Global University Gymnasium, Incheon

=== Knockout round ===
Semifinals
2 October
India	41
Thailand	28
2 October
Iran	40
Bangladesh	15

Final
3 October
India	31
Iran	21

==== Semifinals ====
2 October
10:00

India	41–28 (HT: 14–14)	Thailand

Songdo Global University Gymnasium, Incheon

2 October
11:00

Iran	40–15 (HT: 25–2)	Bangladesh

Songdo Global University Gymnasium, Incheon

==== Final ====
3 October
10:00

India	31–21 (HT: 15–11)	Iran

Songdo Global University Gymnasium, Incheon

== Final standing ==
Rank	Team	Pld	W	D	L
1st place, gold medalist(s)	India	4	4	0	0
2nd place, silver medalist(s)	Iran	5	4	0	1
3rd place, bronze medalist(s)	Bangladesh	3	1	0	2
3rd place, bronze medalist(s)	Thailand	4	2	0	2
5	Japan	3	1	0	2
5	South Korea	2	0	0	2
7	Chinese Taipei	3	0	0	3
