= Kabaddi at the 2014 Asian Games – Men's tournament =

Men at the 2014 Asian Games
- Venue: Songdo Global University Gymnasium
- Date: 28 September – 3 October 2014
- Competitors: 92 from 8 nations

Medalists
gold medal	India
silver medal	Iran
bronze medal	South Korea
bronze medal	Pakistan

Men's Kabaddi at the 2014 Asian Games was held in Songdo Global University Gymnasium, Incheon, South Korea from 28 September to 3 October 2014.

== Squads ==
Bangladesh	India	Iran	Japan
Ziaur Rahman; Abu Salah Musa; Maftun Haque; Aruduzzaman Munshi; Tipu Sultan; Kamal Hossain; Omar Faruk; Mohammad Firozzaman; Zakir Hossain; Md Ashraful Shaikh; Masud Karim; Shazid Hossain	Jasvir Singh; Anup Kumar; Manjeet Chhillar; Ajay Thakur; Rakesh Kumar; Gurpreet Singh; Navneet Gautam; Surjeet Kumar; Parveen Kumar; Nitin Madane; Surjeet Singh Narwal; Rajaguru Subramanian	Fazel Atrachali; Meraj Sheikh; Mehdi Mousavi; Hadi Oshtorak; Gholam Abbas Korouki; Farhad Rahimi; Mohammad Maghsoudloo; Meisam Abbasi; Hadi Tajik; Reza Kamali Moghaddam; Abolfazl Maghsoudloo; Meisam Ghajar	Kazuhiro Takano; Terukazu Nitta; Kokei Ito; Kazuaki Murakami; Masayuki Ota; Taiki Nama; Ryokei Kushige; Masayuki Shimokawa; Takamitsu Kono; Jiro Watanabe
Malaysia	Pakistan	South Korea	Thailand
Jegankumar Balaraman; Mugilan Batumalai; Krishnan Nair Prakash; Kartigeyen Bandi; Dinishwaran Markandan; Sasikumar Manimaran; Premkumar Pushparajan; Prem Mohan; Edwin Srirush Muniandy; Justin Johnson	Nasir Ali; Muhammad Kashif; Atif Waheed; Wajid Ali; Waseem Sajjad; Ibrar Hussain; Muhammad Rizwan; Aqeel Hassan; Muhammad Nisar; Muhammad Shahbaz Anwar; Shabbir Ahmed; Hassan Ali	Kim Ki-dong; Eom Tae-deok; Park Hyun-il; Lee Jang-kun; Hong Dong-ju; Yook Sang-min; Ahn Hwan-gi; Jung Kwang-soo; Kim Seong-ryeol; Seo Dea-ho; Kim Gyung-tae; Heo Youn-chan	Thanakorn Boonpiam; Tin Phonchoo; Khomsan Thongkham; Worawut Chuaikoed; Khunakon Chanjaroen; Suttikiat Chumpornpan; Nisit Chairat; Phuwanai Wannasaen; Chaitawat Sittisom; Sarawut Hopet; Santi Bunchoet; Thanongsak Srihera

== Results ==
All times are Korea Standard Time (UTC+09:00)

=== Preliminary ===
==== Group A ====
Pos	Team	Pld	W	D	L	PF	PA	PD	Pts	Qualification
1	India	3	3	0	0	119	53	+66	6	Semifinals
2	Pakistan	3	2	0	1	86	64	+22	4	Semifinals
3	Thailand	3	1	0	2	94	153	−59	2	
4	Bangladesh	3	0	0	3	62	91	−29	0	

Source: Official website

28 September
14:00

India	30–15 (HT: 16–6)	Bangladesh

Songdo Global University Gymnasium, Incheon

28 September
15:00

Pakistan	51–30 (HT: 29–9)	Thailand

Songdo Global University Gymnasium, Incheon

29 September
14:00

India	66–27 (HT: 29–15)	Thailand

Songdo Global University Gymnasium, Incheon

29 September
15:00

Pakistan	24–11 (HT: 13–4)	Bangladesh

Songdo Global University Gymnasium, Incheon

30 September
16:00

India	23–11 (HT: 17–4)	Pakistan

Songdo Global University Gymnasium, Incheon

1 October
14:00

Thailand	37–36 (HT: 16–21)	Bangladesh

Songdo Global University Gymnasium, Incheon

==== Group B ====
Pos	Team	Pld	W	D	L	PF	PA	PD	Pts	Qualification
1	Iran	3	3	0	0	150	65	+85	6	Semifinals
2	South Korea	3	2	0	1	104	90	+14	4	Semifinals
3	Malaysia	3	1	0	2	77	113	−36	2	
4	Japan	3	0	0	3	57	120	−63	0	

Source: Official website

28 September
16:00

Iran	56–22 (HT: 20–8)	Malaysia

Songdo Global University Gymnasium, Incheon

28 September
17:00

Japan	17–44 (HT: 9–24)	South Korea

Songdo Global University Gymnasium, Incheon

30 September
14:00

Iran	41–22 (HT: 14–8)	South Korea

Songdo Global University Gymnasium, Incheon

30 September
15:00

Japan	19–23 (HT: 8–8)	Malaysia

Songdo Global University Gymnasium, Incheon

1 October
15:00

Iran	53–21 (HT: 23–7)	Japan

Songdo Global University Gymnasium, Incheon

1 October
16:00

South Korea	38–32 (HT: 21–11)	Malaysia

Songdo Global University Gymnasium, Incheon

=== Knockout round ===
Semifinals
2 October
India	36
South Korea	25
2 October
Iran	25
Pakistan	14

Final
3 October
India	27
Iran	25

==== Semifinals ====
2 October
13:00

India	36–25 (HT: 14–12)	South Korea

Songdo Global University Gymnasium, Incheon

2 October
14:00

Iran	25–14 (HT: 9–9)	Pakistan

Songdo Global University Gymnasium, Incheon

==== Final ====
3 October
12:30

India	27–25 (HT: 13–21)	Iran

Songdo Global University Gymnasium, Incheon

== Final standing ==
Rank	Team	Pld	W	D	L
1st place, gold medalist(s)	India	5	5	0	0
2nd place, silver medalist(s)	Iran	5	4	0	1
3rd place, bronze medalist(s)	Pakistan	4	2	0	2
3rd place, bronze medalist(s)	South Korea	4	2	0	2
5	Malaysia	3	1	0	2
5	Thailand	3	1	0	2
7	Bangladesh	3	0	0	3
7	Japan	3	0	0	3
