= Kabaddi at the 2014 Asian Games =

- Venue: Songdo Global University Gymnasium
- Dates: 28 September – 3 October 2014
- Competitors: 174 from 9 nations

Kabaddi at the 2014 Asian Games was held in Songdo Global University Gymnasium, Incheon, South Korea from 28 September to 3 October 2014. Both of India's men's and women's teams faced and defeated Iran's respective teams in the finals, earning India's teams the Gold while Iran's teams won the Silver. Meanwhile the men's team for both South Korea and Pakistan won the Bronze, as well as the women's teams of Bangladesh and Thailand, after their respective defeats in semifinals.

== Schedule ==
P	Preliminary round	½	Semifinals	F	Final

Event↓/Date →	28th Sun	29th Mon	30th Tue	1st Wed	2nd Thu	3rd Fri
Men	P	P	P	P	½	F
Women	P	P	P	P	½	F

== Medalists ==
Event	Gold	Silver	Bronze
Men	India; Jasvir Singh; Anup Kumar; Manjeet Chhillar; Ajay Thakur; Rakesh Kumar; Gurpreet Singh; Navneet Gautam; Surjeet Kumar; Parveen Kumar; Nitin Madane; Surjeet Singh Narwal; Rajaguru Subramanian	Iran; Fazel Atrachali; Meraj Sheikh; Mehdi Mousavi; Hadi Oshtorak; Gholam Abbas Korouki; Farhad Rahimi; Mohammad Maghsoudloo; Meisam Abbasi; Hadi Tajik; Reza Kamali Moghaddam; Abolfazl Maghsoudloo; Meisam Ghajar	South Korea; Kim Ki-dong; Eom Tae-deok; Park Hyun-il; Lee Jang-kun; Hong Dong-ju; Yook Sang-min; Ahn Hwan-gi; Jung Kwang-soo; Kim Seong-ryeol; Seo Dea-ho; Kim Gyung-tae; Heo Youn-chan
Men	India; Jasvir Singh; Anup Kumar; Manjeet Chhillar; Ajay Thakur; Rakesh Kumar; Gurpreet Singh; Navneet Gautam; Surjeet Kumar; Parveen Kumar; Nitin Madane; Surjeet Singh Narwal; Rajaguru Subramanian	Iran; Fazel Atrachali; Meraj Sheikh; Mehdi Mousavi; Hadi Oshtorak; Gholam Abbas Korouki; Farhad Rahimi; Mohammad Maghsoudloo; Meisam Abbasi; Hadi Tajik; Reza Kamali Moghaddam; Abolfazl Maghsoudloo; Meisam Ghajar	Pakistan; Nasir Ali; Muhammad Kashif; Atif Waheed; Wajid Ali; Waseem Sajjad; Ibrar Hussain; Muhammad Rizwan; Aqeel Hassan; Muhammad Nisar; Muhammad Shahbaz Anwar; Shabbir Ahmed; Hassan Ali
Women	India; Kavita Thakur; Kavita Devi; V. Tejeswini Bai; Abhilasha Mhatre; Pooja Thakur; Priyanka Pilaniya; Anita Mavi; Lakshman Singh Jayanthi; Sumitra Sharma; Mamatha Poojary; Sushmita Pawar; Kishore Dilip Shinde	Iran; Salimeh Abdollahbakhsh; Zahra Masoumabadi; Marzieh Eshghi; Maliheh Miri; Sedigheh Jafari; Ghazal Khalaj; Farideh Zarifdoust; Mojgan Zare; Hengameh Bourghani; Sahar Ilat; Saeideh Jafari; Tahereh Tirgar	Thailand; Alisa Limsamran; Namfon Kangkeeree; Chonlada Chaiprapan; Kamontip Suwanchana; Alisa Thongsook; Sai Jaemjaroen; Atchara Puangngern; Nuchanart Maiwan; Nuntarat Nuntakitkoson; Rattana Rueangkoet; Wattakan Kammachot; Naleerat Ketsaro
Women	India; Kavita Thakur; Kavita Devi; V. Tejeswini Bai; Abhilasha Mhatre; Pooja Thakur; Priyanka Pilaniya; Anita Mavi; Lakshman Singh Jayanthi; Sumitra Sharma; Mamatha Poojary; Sushmita Pawar; Kishore Dilip Shinde	Iran; Salimeh Abdollahbakhsh; Zahra Masoumabadi; Marzieh Eshghi; Maliheh Miri; Sedigheh Jafari; Ghazal Khalaj; Farideh Zarifdoust; Mojgan Zare; Hengameh Bourghani; Sahar Ilat; Saeideh Jafari; Tahereh Tirgar	Bangladesh; Shahnaz Parvin Maleka; Kazi Shahin Ara; Sharmin Sultana Rima; Farzana Akhter Baby; Fatema Akhter Poly; Juni Chakma; Shila Akhter; Rupali Akhter; Suma Akhter; Mita Khatun; Tuktuki Akhter; Azmira Khatun Dola

== Medal table ==
Rank	Nation	Gold	Silver	Bronze	Total
1	India (IND)	2	0	0	2
2	Iran (IRI)	0	2	0	2
3	Bangladesh (BAN)	0	0	1	1
3	Pakistan (PAK)	0	0	1	1
3	South Korea (KOR)	0	0	1	1
3	Thailand (THA)	0	0	1	1
Totals (6 entries)		2	2	4	8

== Draw ==
A draw ceremony was held on 21 August 2014 to determine the groups for the men's and women's competitions. The teams were seeded based on their final ranking at the 2010 Asian Games.

=== Men ===
Group A

- India (1)
- Pakistan (3)
- Thailand
- Bangladesh

Group B

- Iran (2)
- Japan (3)
- South Korea
- Malaysia

=== Women ===
Group A

- India (1)
- Bangladesh (3)
- South Korea

Group B

- Thailand (2)
- Iran (3)
- Japan
- Chinese Taipei

== Final standing ==
=== Men ===
Rank	Team	Pld	W	D	L
1st place, gold medalist(s)	India	5	5	0	0
2nd place, silver medalist(s)	Iran	5	4	0	1
3rd place, bronze medalist(s)	Pakistan	4	2	0	2
3rd place, bronze medalist(s)	South Korea	4	2	0	2
5	Malaysia	3	1	0	2
5	Thailand	3	1	0	2
7	Bangladesh	3	0	0	3
7	Japan	3	0	0	3

=== Women ===
Rank	Team	Pld	W	D	L
1st place, gold medalist(s)	India	4	4	0	0
2nd place, silver medalist(s)	Iran	5	4	0	1
3rd place, bronze medalist(s)	Bangladesh	3	1	0	2
3rd place, bronze medalist(s)	Thailand	4	2	0	2
5	Japan	3	1	0	2
5	South Korea	2	0	0	2
7	Chinese Taipei	3	0	0	3
