= Indoor kabaddi at the 2013 Asian Indoor and Martial Arts Games =

- Venue: Sangnoksu Gymnasium
- Dates: 29 June – 3 July 2013

Indoor Kabaddi for the 2013 Asian Indoor and Martial Arts Games was held at the Ansan Sangnoksu Gymnasium. It took place from 29 June to 3 July 2013. Women's indoor kabaddi teams made their debut in these Games, as only the men's teams were allowed to compete for medals at both Macau 2007 and Hanoi 2009 previously.

== Medalists ==
Event	Gold	Silver	Bronze
Men	Independent Olympic Athletes; Rakesh Kumar; Anup Kumar; Ajay Thakur; Samarjeet; Jasvir Singh; Satish Kumar; Surjeet Singh Narwal	Iran; Kianoush Naderian; Meraj Sheikh; Abolfazl Maghsoudloo; Esmaeil Maghsoudloo; Fazel Atrachali; Navid Nazari; Farhad Rahimi	South Korea; Kim Ki-dong; Eom Tae-deok; Lee Jang-kun; Hong Dong-ju; Ahn Hwan-gi; Kim Seong-ryeol; Maeng Moo-sung
Men	Independent Olympic Athletes; Rakesh Kumar; Anup Kumar; Ajay Thakur; Samarjeet; Jasvir Singh; Satish Kumar; Surjeet Singh Narwal	Iran; Kianoush Naderian; Meraj Sheikh; Abolfazl Maghsoudloo; Esmaeil Maghsoudloo; Fazel Atrachali; Navid Nazari; Farhad Rahimi	Thailand; Janwit Diskanan; Tin Phonchoo; Khomsan Thongkham; Worawut Chuaikoed; Santi Bunchoet; Phuwanai Wannasaen; Nisit Chairat
Women	Independent Olympic Athletes; V. Tejeswini Bai; Deepika Henry Joseph; Priyanka; Suman; Abhilasha Mhatre; Mamatha Poojary; Kavita Thakur	Iran; Samira Shabani; Salimeh Abdollahbakhsh; Marzieh Eshghi; Farideh Zarifdoust; Sedigheh Jafari; Sahar Ilat; Hengameh Bourghani	South Korea; Im Jae-won; Lee Hyun-jeong; Shin So-min; Kim Hee-jeong; Yoon Yu-ri; Seo Eun-hye; Jo Hyun-a
Women	Independent Olympic Athletes; V. Tejeswini Bai; Deepika Henry Joseph; Priyanka; Suman; Abhilasha Mhatre; Mamatha Poojary; Kavita Thakur	Iran; Samira Shabani; Salimeh Abdollahbakhsh; Marzieh Eshghi; Farideh Zarifdoust; Sedigheh Jafari; Sahar Ilat; Hengameh Bourghani	Thailand; Alisa Limsamran; Namfon Kangkeeree; Naleerat Ketsaro; Kamontip Suwanchana; Nuchanart Maiwan; Wattakan Kammachot; Nuntarat Nuntakitkoson

== Medal table ==
Rank	Nation	Gold	Silver	Bronze	Total
1	Independent Olympic Athletes (AOI)	2	0	0	2
2	Iran (IRI)	0	2	0	2
3	South Korea (KOR)	0	0	2	2
3	Thailand (THA)	0	0	2	2
Totals (4 entries)		2	2	4	8

== Results ==
=== Men ===
==== Preliminary ====
Pos	Team	Pld	W	D	L	PF	PA	PD	Pts
1	Independent Olympic Athletes	5	5	0	0	255	163	+92	10
2	Iran	5	4	0	1	244	147	+97	8
3	South Korea	5	3	0	2	222	155	+67	6
4	Thailand	5	2	0	3	216	281	−65	4
5	Japan	5	1	0	4	208	215	−7	2
6	Turkmenistan	5	0	0	5	145	329	−184	0

Source: Official website

29 June
12:00

Turkmenistan	23–55 (HT: 8–29)	South Korea

Sangnoksu Gymnasium, Ansan

29 June
12:45

Japan	28–51 (HT: 17–23)	Iran

Sangnoksu Gymnasium, Ansan

29 June
13:30

Thailand	40–68 (HT: 15–37)	Independent Olympic Athletes

Sangnoksu Gymnasium, Ansan

29 June
14:15

Turkmenistan	20–72 (HT: 10–35)	Iran

Sangnoksu Gymnasium, Ansan

30 June
14:00

South Korea	29–42 (HT: 11–25)	Independent Olympic Athletes

Sangnoksu Gymnasium, Ansan

30 June
14:45

Japan	47–50 (HT: 30–19)	Thailand

Sangnoksu Gymnasium, Ansan

30 June
15:30

Turkmenistan	37–54 (HT: 14–33)	Independent Olympic Athletes

Sangnoksu Gymnasium, Ansan

30 June
16:15

Iran	58–27 (HT: 28–19)	Thailand

Sangnoksu Gymnasium, Ansan

1 July
14:00

South Korea	42–32 (HT: 20–13)	Japan

Sangnoksu Gymnasium, Ansan

1 July
14:45

Turkmenistan	43–76 (HT: 15–50)	Thailand

Sangnoksu Gymnasium, Ansan

1 July
15:30

Independent Olympic Athletes	50–29 (HT: 31–12)	Japan

Sangnoksu Gymnasium, Ansan

1 July
16:15

Iran	35–31 (HT: 17–17)	South Korea

Sangnoksu Gymnasium, Ansan

2 July
9:0

Turkmenistan	22–72 (HT: 9–39)	Japan

Sangnoksu Gymnasium, Ansan

2 July
9:45

Thailand	23–65 (HT: 13–31)	South Korea

Sangnoksu Gymnasium, Ansan

2 July
10:30

Independent Olympic Athletes	41–28 (HT: 25–10)	Iran

Sangnoksu Gymnasium, Ansan

==== Gold medal match ====
3 July
11:00

Independent Olympic Athletes	42–32 (HT: 19–16)	Iran

Sangnoksu Gymnasium, Ansan

=== Women ===
==== Preliminary ====
===== Group A =====
Pos	Team	Pld	W	D	L	PF	PA	PD	Pts
1	Iran	3	3	0	0	171	91	+80	6
2	Thailand	3	2	0	1	142	164	−22	4
3	Vietnam	3	1	0	2	139	176	−37	2
4	Japan	3	0	0	3	119	140	−21	0

Source: Official website

29 June
9:00

Thailand	71–60 (HT: 34–37)	Vietnam

Sangnoksu Gymnasium, Ansan

29 June
10:30

Iran	46–35 (HT: 24–14)	Japan

Sangnoksu Gymnasium, Ansan

30 June
9:00

Thailand	45–44 (HT: 24–18)	Japan

Sangnoksu Gymnasium, Ansan

30 June
10:30

Iran	65–30 (HT: 30–17)	Vietnam

Sangnoksu Gymnasium, Ansan

1 July
9:00

Thailand	26–60 (HT: 12–30)	Iran

Sangnoksu Gymnasium, Ansan

1 July
10:30

Japan	40–49 (HT: 19–23)	Vietnam

Sangnoksu Gymnasium, Ansan

===== Group B =====
Pos	Team	Pld	W	D	L	PF	PA	PD	Pts
1	Independent Olympic Athletes	3	3	0	0	217	94	+123	6
2	South Korea	3	2	0	1	165	122	+43	4
3	Chinese Taipei	3	1	0	2	115	171	−56	2
4	Turkmenistan	3	0	0	3	110	220	−110	0

Source: Official website

29 June
9:45

Independent Olympic Athletes	83–45 (HT: 48–16)	Turkmenistan

Sangnoksu Gymnasium, Ansan

29 June
11:15

South Korea	65–29 (HT: 38–8)	Chinese Taipei

Sangnoksu Gymnasium, Ansan

30 June
9:45

Independent Olympic Athletes	73–23 (HT: 43–11)	Chinese Taipei

Sangnoksu Gymnasium, Ansan

30 June
11:15

South Korea	74–32 (HT: 37–12)	Turkmenistan

Sangnoksu Gymnasium, Ansan

1 July
9:45

Independent Olympic Athletes	61–26 (HT: 29–16)	South Korea

Sangnoksu Gymnasium, Ansan

1 July
11:15

Chinese Taipei	63–33 (HT: 34–14)	Turkmenistan

Sangnoksu Gymnasium, Ansan

==== Knockout round ====
Semifinals
2 July
Iran	55
South Korea	29
2 July
Independent Olympic Athletes	79
Thailand	29

Gold medal match
3 July
Iran	31
Independent Olympic Athletes	54

===== Semifinals =====
2 July
14:00

Iran	55–29 (HT: 26–10)	South Korea

Sangnoksu Gymnasium, Ansan

2 July
15:00

Independent Olympic Athletes	79–29 (HT: 41–10)	Thailand

Sangnoksu Gymnasium, Ansan

===== Gold medal match =====
3 July
10:00

Iran	31–54 (HT: 14–28)	Independent Olympic Athletes

Sangnoksu Gymnasium, Ansan
