= Kabaddi at the 2018 Asian Games – Men's tournament =

Men at the 2018 Asian Games
- Venue: Garuda Theatre
- Date: 19–24 August 2018
- Competitors: 130 from 11 nations

Medalists
gold medal	Iran
silver medal	South Korea
bronze medal	Pakistan
bronze medal	India

Men's Kabaddi at the 2018 Asian Games was held in Garuda Theatre, Taman Mini Indonesia Indah, Jakarta, Indonesia from 19 to 24 August 2018.

== Squads ==
Bangladesh	India	Indonesia	Iran
Masud Karim; Aruduzzaman Munshi; Md Ashraful Shaikh; Ziaur Rahman; Zakir Hossain; Sabuj Mia; Anwer Hossain; Fatin Fuhad; Md Ruhul Amin; Shazid Hossain; Arif Rabbani; Tuhin Tarafder	Monu Goyat; Rahul Chaudhari; Mohit Chhillar; Ajay Thakur; Girish Maruti Ernak; Pardeep Narwal; Sandeep Narwal; Raju Lal Choudhary; Rishank Devadiga; Rohit Kumar; Deepak Niwas Hooda; Gangadhari Mallesh	I Gede Feri Setiawan; I Ketut Sudita; I Made Arya Negara; I Wayan Halus Suandana; Dicki Candra; Ida Bagus Ketut Wipradana; I Komang Dandy Darmawan; Faisal Ihsan Kamil; Setya Yogasena; Aldino Indrayana; I Putu Wahyu Juniartha; I Nyoman Tos Pasek Wiguna	Fazel Atrachali; Mohammad Esmaeil Nabibakhsh; Mohammad Amin Nosrati; Hadi Oshtorak; Mohammad Mallak; Mohammad Ghorbani; Esmaeil Maghsoudloo; Meisam Abbasi; Mohsen Maghsoudloo; Abouzar Mohajer; Abolfazl Maghsoudloo; Hamid Mirzaei
Japan	Malaysia	Nepal	Pakistan
Masayuki Shimokawa; Takamitsu Kono; Terukazu Nitta; Kazuhiro Takano; Tetsuro Abe; Etsuki Manita; Masaki Hatakeyama; Yuten Kawate; Takuya Kikuchi; Tetsuya Itagaki	Prabhakaran Mani; Dinesh Tamilselvam; Allexson Lian Sin; Ganga Tharen Thana Seelan; Thanaselan Nadarajan; Tavitaran Nedunjilan; Vimalanathan Pavadai; Devan Munisvaran; Prabakaran Maksvaran; Dinishwaran Markandan; Logean Ravindran; Sasikumar Manimaran	Ashok Thapa Magar; Lal Mohar Yadav; Bhupendra Chand; Mahesh Bohara; Ranjit Gajmer; Amit Kunwar; Bijaya Kumar Chand; Kumar Lama; Nageshwor Tharu; Durga Bahadur Kumal; Mahesh Kumar Mandal; Sagar Chaudhary	Nasir Ali; Waseem Sajjad; Muhammad Nadeem; Muhammad Rizwan; Abid Hussain; Waqar Ali; Tahseen Ullah; Usman Zada; Mudassar Ali; Kashif Razzaq; Muhammad Imran; Hassan Raza
South Korea	Sri Lanka	Thailand	
Lee Dong-geon; Eom Tae-deok; Ok Yong-joo; Lee Jang-kun; Hong Dong-ju; Kim Dong-gyu; Park Chan-sik; Jo Jae-pil; Kim Seong-ryeol; Park Hyun-il; Kim Gyung-tae; Ko Young-chang	Lahiru Kuruppu; Ruwan Samarakoon; Sajith Indra Kumara; Dilan Sanjaya; Milinda Chathuranga; Lahiru Sampath; Asiri Sandaruwan; Ishara Sampath; Ranidu Chamara; Aslam Saja; Nishantha Gunawardane; Madushan Pushpakumara	Khunakon Chanjaroen; Rittichai Jaisai; Khomsan Thongkham; Teerasak Khunsan; Somboon Asa; Pramot Saising; Sasithon Rungsawang; Worawut Chuaikoed; Phuwanai Wannasaen; Janwit Diskanan; Santi Bunchoet; Kittichai Kanket	

== Results ==
All times are Western Indonesia Time (UTC+07:00)

=== Preliminary round ===
==== Group A ====
Pos	Team	Pld	W	D	L	PF	PA	PD	Pts	Qualification
1	South Korea	4	4	0	0	147	84	+63	8	Semifinals
2	India	4	3	0	1	166	103	+63	6	Semifinals
3	Bangladesh	4	2	0	2	102	135	−33	4	
4	Sri Lanka	4	1	0	3	121	135	−14	2	
5	Thailand	4	0	0	4	102	181	−79	0	

Source: OCA

19 August
14:00

Bangladesh	21–50 (HT: 12–20)	India

Garuda Theatre, Jakarta

19 August
16:00

South Korea	52–21 (HT: 22–15)	Thailand

Garuda Theatre, Jakarta

19 August
19:00

India	44–28 (HT: 27–13)	Sri Lanka

Garuda Theatre, Jakarta

20 August
14:00

Bangladesh	34–22 (HT: 17–7)	Thailand

Garuda Theatre, Jakarta

20 August
16:00

India	23–24 (HT: 11–14)	South Korea

Garuda Theatre, Jakarta

20 August
18:00

Sri Lanka	46–29 (HT: 26–10)	Thailand

Garuda Theatre, Jakarta

21 August
15:00

Bangladesh	29–25 (HT: 17–10)	Sri Lanka

Garuda Theatre, Jakarta

21 August
17:00

India	49–30 (HT: 21–12)	Thailand

Garuda Theatre, Jakarta

22 August
16:00

Bangladesh	18–38 (HT: 8–18)	South Korea

Garuda Theatre, Jakarta

23 August
9:00

South Korea	33–22 (HT: 15–8)	Sri Lanka

Garuda Theatre, Jakarta

==== Group B ====
Pos	Team	Pld	W	D	L	PF	PA	PD	Pts	Qualification
1	Iran	5	5	0	0	289	109	+180	10	Semifinals
2	Pakistan	5	4	0	1	185	98	+87	8	Semifinals
3	Indonesia	5	3	0	2	132	182	−50	6	
4	Japan	5	2	0	3	121	162	−41	4	
5	Nepal	5	1	0	4	127	194	−67	2	
6	Malaysia	5	0	0	5	100	209	−109	0	

Source: OCA

19 August
15:00

Iran	55–20 (HT: 34–8)	Japan

Garuda Theatre, Jakarta

19 August
17:00

Malaysia	17–62 (HT: 4–32)	Pakistan

Garuda Theatre, Jakarta

19 August
18:00

Indonesia	33–29 (HT: 20–14)	Nepal

Garuda Theatre, Jakarta

20 August
15:00

Japan	30–20 (HT: 21–9)	Malaysia

Garuda Theatre, Jakarta

20 August
17:00

Pakistan	20–36 (HT: 8–19)	Iran

Garuda Theatre, Jakarta

20 August
19:00

Indonesia	34–26 (HT: 15–12)	Japan

Garuda Theatre, Jakarta

21 August
14:00

Indonesia	30–22 (HT: 15–11)	Malaysia

Garuda Theatre, Jakarta

21 August
16:00

Japan	31–28 (HT: 12–17)	Nepal

Garuda Theatre, Jakarta

21 August
18:00

Iran	58–24 (HT: 36–10)	Malaysia

Garuda Theatre, Jakarta

21 August
19:00

Indonesia	11–40 (HT: 5–18)	Pakistan

Garuda Theatre, Jakarta

22 August
14:00

Iran	75–21 (HT: 38–6)	Nepal

Garuda Theatre, Jakarta

22 August
15:00

Pakistan	25–14 (HT: 9–6)	Japan

Garuda Theatre, Jakarta

22 August
17:00

Malaysia	17–29 (HT: 10–12)	Nepal

Garuda Theatre, Jakarta

22 August
18:00

Indonesia	24–65 (HT: 10–33)	Iran

Garuda Theatre, Jakarta

23 August
10:00

Nepal	20–38 (HT: 12–15)	Pakistan

Garuda Theatre, Jakarta

=== Knockout round ===
Semifinals
23 August
South Korea	27
Pakistan	24
23 August
Iran	27
India	18

Gold medal match
24 August
South Korea	16
Iran	26

==== Semifinals ====
23 August
17:00

South Korea	27–24 (HT: 11–10)	Pakistan

Garuda Theatre, Jakarta

23 August
18:00

Iran	27–18 (HT: 9–9)	India

Garuda Theatre, Jakarta

==== Gold medal match ====
24 August
17:00

South Korea	16–26 (HT: 8–10)	Iran

Garuda Theatre, Jakarta

== Final standing ==
Rank	Team	Pld	W	D	L
1st place, gold medalist(s)	Iran	7	7	0	0
2nd place, silver medalist(s)	South Korea	6	5	0	1
3rd place, bronze medalist(s)	India	5	3	0	2
3rd place, bronze medalist(s)	Pakistan	6	4	0	2
5	Bangladesh	4	2	0	2
5	Indonesia	5	3	0	2
7	Japan	5	2	0	3
7	Sri Lanka	4	1	0	3
9	Nepal	5	1	0	4
9	Thailand	4	0	0	4
11	Malaysia	5	0	0	5
