= List of Arjuna Award recipients (2010–2019) =

List of recipients of a sports honor in India

Arjuna Award
- Civilian award for outstanding individual achievements in National Sports
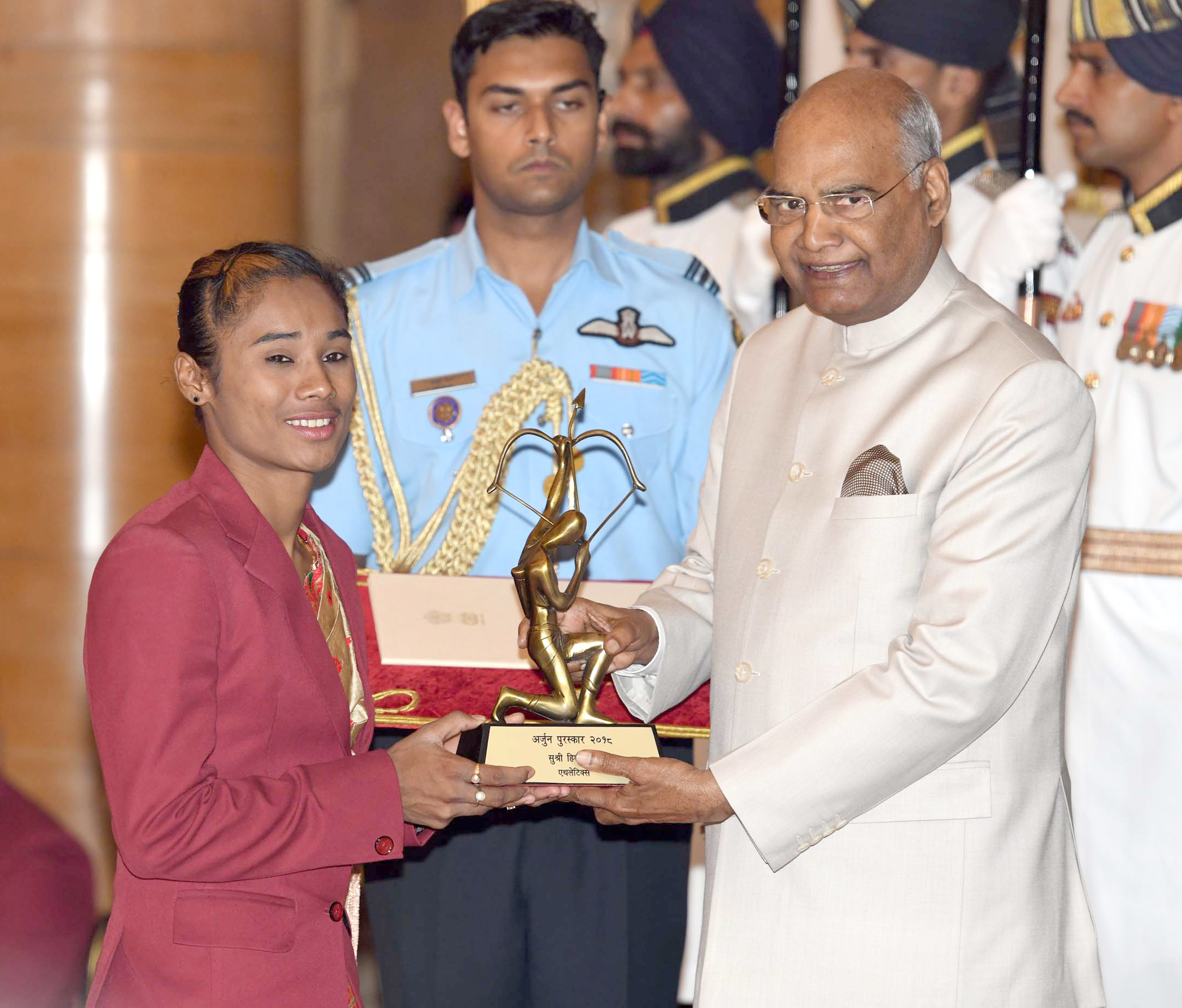
- President Ram Nath Kovind presents the 2018 Arjuna Award to Hima Das for Athletics
- Sponsored by: Government of India
- Established: 1961
- First award: 1961

Highlights
- Total awarded: 178

The Arjuna Award, officially known as the Arjuna Awards for Outstanding Performance in Sports and Games, is the sports honour of the Republic of India. It is awarded annually by the Ministry of Youth Affairs and Sports. Before the introduction of the Major Dhyan Chand Khel Ratna in 1991–1992, the Arjuna award was the highest sporting honour of India. As of 2020, the award comprises "a bronze statuette of Arjuna, certificate, ceremonial dress, and a cash prize of ₹15 lakh (US$16,000)." (Note: The cash prize was introduced in the year 1977–1978 as a scholarship of ₹200 (US$2.10) a month for 2 years. It was revised to one time cash prize of ₹5,000 (US$53) in 1986, to ₹20,000 (US$210) in 1987, to ₹50,000 (US$530) in 1993, to ₹1.5 lakh (US$1,600) in 1998, to ₹3 lakh (US$3,200) in 2001, to ₹5 lakh (US$5,300) in 2009, and to ₹15 lakh (US$16,000) in 2020.)

== Name ==
The award is named after Arjuna, a character from the Sanskrit epic Mahabharata of ancient India. He is one of the Pandavas, depicted as a skilled archer winning the hand of Draupadi in marriage. In the Kurukshetra War, Lord Krishna becomes his charioteer teaching him the sacred knowledge of Gita. In Hindu mythology, he has been seen as a symbol of hard work, dedication and concentration.

== History ==
Instituted in 1961 to honour the outstanding sportspersons of the country, the award over the years has undergone a number of expansions, reviews, and rationalizations. The award was expanded to include all the recognised disciplines in 1977, has introduced indigenous games and physically handicapped categories in 1995 and introduced a lifetime contribution category in 1995 leading to creation of a separate Dhyan Chand Award in 2002. The latest revision in 2018 stipulates that the award is given only to the disciplines included in the events like Olympic Games, Paralympic Games, Asian Games, Commonwealth Games, World Championship and World Cup along with Cricket, Indigenous Games, and Parasports. It also recommends giving only fifteen awards in a year, relaxing in case of excellent performance in major multi-sport events, team sports, across gender and giving at least one award to the physically challenged category.

The nominations for the award are received from all government-recognised National Sports Federations, the Indian Olympic Association, the Sports Authority of India (SAI), the Sports Promotion and Control Boards, the state and the union territory governments and the Rajiv Gandhi Khel Ratna, Arjuna, Dhyan Chand and Dronacharya awardees of the previous years. The recipients are selected by a committee constituted by the Ministry and are honoured for their "good performance in the field of sports over a period of four years" at international level and for having shown "qualities of leadership, sportsmanship and a sense of discipline".

== Recipients ==
A total of 178 awards were presented in the 2010s: fifteen in 2010, followed by nineteen in 2011, twenty-five in 2012, fourteen in 2013, sixteen in 2014, seventeen in 2015, sixteen in 2016, seventeen in 2017, twenty in 2018 and nineteen in 2019. Individuals from thirty different sports were awarded, including twenty-seven from athletics, sixteen from wrestling, fifteen from shooting, twelve each from cricket and hockey, eleven each from badminton and boxing, nine from kabaddi, eight from archery, six from table tennis, five each from football and swimming, four each from golf, weightlifting and wushu, three each from billiards & snooker, lawn tennis, polo, squash and volleyball, two each from basketball, chess, gymnastics and rowing, and one each from bodybuilding, equestrian, judo, motor sports, roller skating and yachting.

In the initial list of 2013, triple jumper Renjith Maheshwary was mentioned in the discipline of athletics. However, after reports surfaced of him failing a doping test in 2008, he was denied the award, making him the first person to be recommended by the Sports Ministry and then denied the award on the day of the function. Boxer Manoj Kumar, a gold medalist at the 2010 Commonwealth Games held at Delhi, was initially not on the 2014 awardees list. He filed a case in Delhi High Court and the Sports Ministry was directed by the court to present him with the award. The ministry blamed the issue on mistakenly believing him to be involved in a doping case and presented him with the award in November 2014, instead of at the official ceremony at Rashtrapati Bhavan in August 2014. Another sportsperson, para-badminton player Raj Kumar, a gold medalist in the 2015 Para-Badminton World Championships in England, approached the Delhi High Court after not being awarded the Arjuna Award in 2016. He finally won the legal battle over having higher points than the other para-athlete awarded, and two years later, in September 2018 was given the award for the year 2016.

== List of Recipients ==
Award recipients by year
Year	Number of recipients
2010	15
2011	19
2012	25
2013	14
2014	16
2015	17
2016	16
2017	17
2018	20
2019	19

Award recipients by sport
Sport	Number of recipients
Archery	8
Athletics	27
Badminton	11
Basketball	2
Billiards & Snooker	3
Powerlifting	1
Boxing	11
Chess	2
Cricket	12
Equestrian	1
Football	5
Golf	4
Gymnastics	2
Hockey	12
Judo	1
Kabaddi	9
Lawn Tennis	3
Motor Sports	1
Polo	3
Roller Skating	1
Rowing	2
Shooting	15
Squash	3
Swimming	5
Table Tennis	6
Volleyball	3
Weightlifting	4
Wrestling	16
Wushu	4
Yachting	1

Key
§	Indicates Para sports

List of Arjuna award recipients, showing the year, sport, and gender
Year	Recipient	Sport	Gender
2010	Joseph Abraham	Athletics	Male
2010	Rajesh Choudhary	Yachting	Male
2010	K. J. Kapil Dev	Volleyball	Male
2010	Jhulan Goswami	Cricket	Female
2010	Jasjeet Kaur Handa	Hockey	Female
2010	Dinesh Kumar	Boxing	Male
2010	Dinesh Kumar	Kabaddi	Male
2010	Deepak Mondal	Football	Male
2010	Parimarjan Negi	Chess	Male
2010	Rehan Poncha	Swimming	Male
2010	Krishna Poonia	Athletics	Female
2010	Sanjeev Rajput	Shooting	Male
2010	Jagseer Singh	Athletics§	Male
2010	Sandeep Singh	Hockey	Male
2010	Rajiv Tomar	Wrestling	Male
2011	Rahul Banerjee	Archery	Male
2011	Sunil Chhetri	Football	Male
2011	W. Sandhyarani Devi	Wushu	Female
2011	Somdev Devvarman	Lawn Tennis	Male
2011	Vikas Gowda	Athletics	Male
2011	Jwala Gutta	Badminton	Female
2011	Prasanta Karmakar	Swimming§	Male
2011	Virdhawal Khade	Swimming	Male
2011	Zaheer Khan	Cricket	Male
2011	Ashish Kumar	Gymnastics	Male
2011	Katulu Ravi Kumar	Weightlifting	Male
2011	Rakesh Kumar	Kabaddi	Male
2011	Sanjay Kumar	Volleyball	Male
2011	Tejaswini Sawant	Shooting	Female
2011	Rajpal Singh	Hockey	Male
2011	Ravinder Singh	Wrestling	Male
2011	Suranjoy Singh	Boxing	Male
2011	Preeja Sreedharan	Athletics	Female
2011	Tejaswini Bai V.	Kabaddi	Female
2012	Ngangbam Soniya Chanu	Weightlifting	Female
2012	Joydeep Karmakar	Shooting	Male
2012	Parupalli Kashyap	Badminton	Male
2012	Anup Kumar	Kabaddi	Male
2012	Rajender Kumar	Wrestling	Male
2012	Deepika Kumari	Archery	Female
2012	Bombayla Devi Laishram	Archery	Female
2012	Deepa Malik	Athletics§	Female
2012	Aditya Mehta	Billiards & Snooker	Male
2012	Dipika Pallikal	Squash	Female
2012	Geeta Phogat	Wrestling	Female
2012	Ashwini Ponnappa	Badminton	Female
2012	Kavita Raut	Athletics	Female
2012	Sandeep Sejwal	Swimming	Male
2012	Annu Raj Singh	Shooting	Female
2012	M. Bimoljit Singh	Wushu	Male
2012	Omkar Singh	Shooting	Male
2012	Ramkaran Singh	Athletics§	Male
2012	Sardara Singh	Hockey	Male
2012	Sudha Singh	Athletics	Female
2012	Yuvraj Singh	Cricket	Male
2012	Yashpal Solanki	Judo	Male
2012	Samir Suhag	Polo	Male
2012	Narsingh Yadav	Wrestling	Male
2012	Vikas Krishan Yadav	Boxing	Male
2013	Gaganjeet Bhullar	Golf	Male
2013	Kavita Chahal	Boxing	Female
2013	Joshna Chinappa	Squash	Female
2013	Dharmender Dalal	Wrestling	Male
2013	Mouma Das	Table Tennis	Female
2013	Abhijeet Gupta	Chess	Male
2013	Saba Anjum Karim	Hockey	Female
2013	Virat Kohli	Cricket	Male
2013	Neha Rathi	Wrestling	Female
2013	Rajkumari Rathore	Shooting	Female
2013	Amit Kumar Saroha	Athletics§	Male
2013	Rupesh Shah	Billiards & Snooker	Male
2013	P. V. Sindhu	Badminton	Female
2013	Chekrovolu Swuro	Archery	Female
2014	Anaka Alankamony	Squash	Female
2014	Ravichandran Ashwin	Cricket	Male
2014	Jai Bhagwan	Boxing	Male
2014	Renu Bala Chanu	Weightlifting	Female
2014	Valiyaveetil Diju	Badminton	Male
2014	H. N. Girisha	Athletics§	Male
2014	Geethu Anna Jose	Basketball	Female
2014	Tom Joseph	Volleyball	Male
2014	Manoj Kumar	Boxing	Male
2014	Anirban Lahiri	Golf	Male
2014	Tintu Luka	Athletics	Female
2014	Mamatha Poojary	Kabaddi	Female
2014	Sunil Kumar Rana	Wrestling	Male
2014	Heena Sidhu	Shooting	Female
2014	Saji Thomas	Rowing	Male
2014	Abhishek Verma	Archery	Male
2015	Manjeet Chhillar	Kabaddi	Male
2015	Yumnam Sanathoi Devi	Wushu	Female
2015	Sharath Gayakwad	Swimming§	Male
2015	Mandeep Jangra	Boxing	Male
2015	Dipa Karmakar	Gymnastics	Female
2015	Srikanth Kidambi	Badminton	Male
2015	Sandeep Kumar	Archery	Male
2015	Babita Kumari	Wrestling	Female
2015	Abhilasha Mhatre	Kabaddi	Female
2015	M. R. Poovamma	Athletics	Female
2015	Bajrang Punia	Wrestling	Male
2015	Jitu Rai	Shooting	Male
2015	Rohit Sharma	Cricket	Male
2015	Sawarn Singh	Rowing	Male
2015	Sathish Sivalingam	Weightlifting	Male
2015	P. R. Sreejesh	Hockey	Male
2015	Anup Kumar Yama	Roller Skating	Male
2016	Lalita Babar	Athletics	Female
2016	Apurvi Chandela	Shooting	Female
2016	Rajat Chauhan	Archery	Male
2016	Amit Kumar Dahiya	Wrestling	Male
2016	Soumyajit Ghosh	Table Tennis	Male
2016	Sourav Kothari	Billiards & Snooker	Male
2016	Raj Kumar	Badminton§	Male
2016	Sandeep Singh Maan	Athletics§	Male
2016	Subrata Pal	Football	Male
2016	Vinesh Phogat	Wrestling	Female
2016	V. R. Raghunath	Hockey	Male
2016	Ajinkya Rahane	Cricket	Male
2016	Ritu Rani	Hockey	Female
2016	Gurpreet Singh	Shooting	Male
2016	Virender Singh	Wrestling§	Male
2016	Shiva Thapa	Boxing	Male
2017	Anthony Amalraj	Table Tennis	Male
2017	Varun Singh Bhati	Athletics§	Male
2017	Shiv Chawrasia	Golf	Male
2017	Oinam Bembem Devi	Football	Female
2017	Satyawart Kadian	Wrestling	Male
2017	Harmanpreet Kaur	Cricket	Female
2017	Khushbir Kaur	Athletics	Female
2017	Saketh Myneni	Lawn Tennis	Male
2017	Prakash Nanjappa	Shooting	Male
2017	Cheteshwar Pujara	Cricket	Male
2017	Arokia Rajiv	Athletics	Male
2017	Devendro Singh	Boxing	Male
2017	Jasvir Singh	Kabaddi	Male
2017	Prashanti Singh	Basketball	Female
2017	S. V. Sunil	Hockey	Male
2017	V. J. Sureka	Archery	Female
2017	Mariyappan Thangavelu	Athletics§	Male
2018	Manika Batra	Table Tennis	Female
2018	Rohan Bopanna	Lawn Tennis	Male
2018	Neeraj Chopra	Athletics	Male
2018	Hima Das	Athletics	Female
2018	Ankur Dhama	Athletics§	Male
2018	Sathiyan Gnanasekaran	Table Tennis	Male
2018	Jinson Johnson	Athletics	Male
2018	Pooja Kadian	Wushu	Female
2018	Satish Kumar	Boxing	Male
2018	Sumit Malik	Wrestling	Male
2018	Smriti Mandhana	Cricket	Female
2018	Ankur Mittal	Shooting	Male
2018	Savita Punia	Hockey	Female
2018	Ravi Rathore	Polo	Male
2018	N. Sikki Reddy	Badminton	Female
2018	Manoj Sarkar	Badminton§	Male
2018	Rahi Sarnobat	Shooting	Female
2018	Shubhankar Sharma	Golf	Male
2018	Manpreet Singh	Hockey	Male
2018	Shreyasi Singh	Shooting	Female
2019	Muhammed Anas	Athletics	Male
2019	Swapna Barman	Athletics	Female
2019	Pramod Bhagat	Badminton§	Male
2019	S. Bhaskaran	Powerlifting	Male
2019	Harmeet Desai	Table Tennis	Male
2019	Sonia Lather	Boxing	Female
2019	Gaurav Gill	Motor Sports	Male
2019	Sundar Singh Gurjar	Athletics§	Male
2019	Ravindra Jadeja	Cricket	Male
2019	Chinglensana Kangujam	Hockey	Male
2019	Sonia Lather	Boxing	Female
2019	Fouaad Mirza	Equestrian	Male
2019	Anjum Moudgil	Shooting	Female
2019	B. Sai Praneeth	Badminton	Male
2019	Gurpreet Singh Sandhu	Football	Male
2019	Simran Singh Shergill	Polo	Male
2019	Ajay Thakur	Kabaddi	Male
2019	Tejinder Pal Singh Toor	Athletics	Male
2019	Poonam Yadav	Cricket	Female
