= Bedkihal =

Bedakihal Bedakihal
- Village
- Location in Bedakihal Karnataka, India Bedakihal (India)
- Coordinates: 16.42°N 74.58°E
- Country: India
- State: Karnataka
- District: ಬೆಳಗಾವಿ Belagavi
- Talukas: Nippani

Population (2011)
  - Total: 11,355

Languages
  - Official: Kannada
- Time zone: UTC+5:30 (IST)
- Website: The Bedakihal

Bedakihal is a village in the northern state of Karnataka, India. It is located in the Nippani taluk of Belagavi district in Karnataka. Bedakihal it is famous for "Shree Kalyana Siddheshwar" festival in Dasara every year. During dasara festival the main attraction is the Shee Siddeshwara Palaki procession which starts in the afternoon on the day of Bedakihal dasara from Shree Siddeshwara temple and will be taken through the village yatra and Palaki reaches temple on the next day morning. There are many events every year including kabaddi, marathon, volleyball, rangoli, kusti at Siddeshwara Kusti ground where the likes of Karthik Kate, Bala Rafiq shaik, Nitin Madane, Mauli Jamadade and many Indian wrestlers have participated. To add to the glory of Bedkihal Kusti last year two Russian wrestlers also participated in Bedkihal Kusti. As soon as Ghatstapana starts entire village will be decorated with beautiful lights which will make every person mesmerized. In the night view of the village looks beautiful.

Madhalawada or MadhalaKilla or Inamdar Killa or Inamdarwada: Coordinates : 16°32’8″N 74°29’9″E

== Demographics ==
According to the 2011 Census of India, Bedkihal had a population of 11,355 people living in 2,618 households. There were 5,832 males and 5,523 females. The village had 1,232 children aged 0–6 years, comprising 668 boys and 564 girls.
