= Mohammad Kashif =

Mohammad or Muhammad Kashif may refer to:

- Mohammad Kashif (Dutch cricketer), Dutch cricketer
- Muhammad Kashif (Kuwaiti cricketer) (born 1987), Kuwaiti cricketer
- Muhammad Kashif (kabaddi), Pakistani kabaddi player
