= Maghsoudlou =

Maghsoudlou (Persian: مقصودلو), also spelled Maghsoodloo or Maghsoodloo is an Iranian surname. Notable people with the surname include:

== Maghsoudlou ==
- Abolfazl Maghsoudlou (born 1992), Iranian Kabaddi player
- Bahman Maghsoudlou (born 1946), Iranian scholar, critic and director

== Maghsoudloo ==
- Amir Tataloo (AmirHossein Maghsoudloo; born 1987), Iranian singer, rapper and songwriter

== Maghsoodloo ==
- Parham Maghsoodloo (born 2000), Iranian chess player
