= Kishore Shinde =

Indian professional kabaddi player

Medal record

Representing India

Women's Kabaddi

Asian Games
Gold medal – first place	2014 Incheon	Team

Kishore Dilip Shinde is an Indian professional kabaddi player. She was member of the India national kabaddi team that won the women's kabaddi gold medal at the 2014 Asian Games in Incheon.

She has been awarded with Maharashtra state award Shiv Chatrapati Award for the year 2014-2015. It is the highest sporting honour for any sports player in Maharashtra

She has also represented in first ever women's kabaddi league Women's Kabaddi Challenge by Pro Kabaddi in the year 2016. In this tournament she was part of team Fire Birds which was led by Kabaddi star Mamatha Poojary. The Fire Birds lost in finals against the Storm Queens led by Tejaswini Bai.

Kishori Shinde was No 1 defender of the tournament by 15 Successful Tackle points.
