= Sonali Shingate =

Indian Kabaddi player

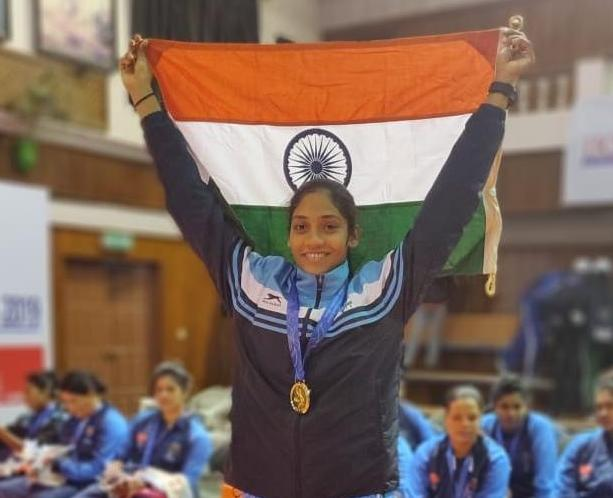
- Sonali Shingate at SAG 2019

Personal information
- Full name: Sonali Vishnu Shingate
- Born: 27 May 1995 (age 31) Mumbai, Maharashtra, India
- Occupation: Kabaddi Player
- Years active: from 2014 to date
- Employer: Indian Railways
- Height: 171 cm (5 ft 7 in)

Sport
- Country: India
- Sport: Kabaddi
- Position: Raider
- League: Women's Kabaddi Challenge
- Club: Shivshakti Mahila Sangh
- Team: India, Maharashtra, Indian Railways, Ice Divas
Medal record
Women's Kabaddi
Representing India
Asian Games
Gold medal – first place	2026 Aichi–Nagoya	Team
Silver medal – second place	2018 Jakarta	Team
South Asian Games
Gold medal – first place	2019 Kathmandu	Team
Asian Kabaddi Championship
Gold medal – first place	2025 Iran	Team

Sonali Vishnu Shingate (born 27 May 1995) is an Indian professional women's kabaddi player and a member of the India national kabaddi team. She was part of the national teams that won the gold medal at the 2019 South Asian Games as well as the silver medal at the 2018 Asian Games.

In 2020, the Government of Maharashtra presented her with the Shiv Chhatrapati Award for her contributions to the sport.

== Early life and education ==
Shingate was born 27 May 1995 to a middle-class family from Maharashtra. She started playing kabaddi after completing her high school education. She began training for the game at the Shiv Shakti Mahila Sangha club under coach Rajesh Padave.

Shingate attended Maharshi Dayanand College, where she played for the school's kabaddi team.

== Career ==
=== National career ===
Shingate began her career representing Maharashtra at the 2014 Junior Nationals, where the team made it to the quarterfinals. The following year, she represented Maharashtra as team captain, and the team made it to the finals. Due to her performance at the 2015 Junior Nationals, Shingate received a job with the Indian Railways and a position on their women's Kabaddi team.

=== International career ===
Shingate made her international debut in 2018 when she was selected to represent India at the 2018 Asian Games; the team won the silver medal. The following year, she competed in the 2019 South Asian Games, winning gold.
