= Raju Lal Choudhary =

Indian kabaddi player

Personal information
- Nationality: Indian
- Born: 12 February 1988 (age 38) Jaipur, Rajasthan, India

Sport
- Country: India
- Sport: Kabaddi
- Position: Defender
- League: Pro Kabaddi League
- Club: 2014 - 2016 Jaipur Pink Panthers; 2018- 2019-Bengaluru Bulls
- Team: India
Medal record
Representing India
Asian Games
Bronze medal – third place	2018 Jakarta	India

Raju Lal Choudhary (born 12 February 1988) is an Indian international kabaddi player who played for Jaipur Pink Panthers in Pro Kabaddi League seasons 1–3 and for Bengaluru Bulls in season 6 and 7. He was also a part of the India national kabaddi team at the 2018 Kabaddi Masters Dubai and 2018 Asian Games.

== Early life ==
Choudhary was born on 12 February 1988 in Jaipur, Rajasthan. His father is a farmer and mother is a homemaker.

== Career ==
Choudhary was a part of the Jaipur Pink Panthers in Pro Kabaddi season 1, 2 and 3. He has been a part of Haryana Steelers in season 4 of 2017. Was a part of the gold medal winning team at Kabaddi Masters Dubai in 2018. Won the bronze medal in the 2018 Asian Games. He Was part of the winning team Bengaluru Bulls in Pro Kabaddi Season 6 and 7. He has also played for Services as well as for Rajasthan as Right Corner.
