= Hadi Tajik =

Iranian kabaddi player (born 1992)

Personal information
- Nationality: Iranian
- Born: 7 August 1992 (age 34)

Sport
- Country: Iran
- Sport: kabaddi
- Position: defender, right corner
- League: Pro Kabaddi League
- Club: U Mumba; Dabang Delhi; UP Yoddha; Puneri Paltan
- Team: Iran national kabaddi team
Medal record
Representing Iran
Men's Kabaddi
Dubai Kabaddi Masters
Silver medal – second place	2018 Dubai	team
Asian Games
Silver medal – second place	2014 Incheon	team

Hadi Tajik (born 7 August 1992) is an Iranian professional kabaddi player represents Iran in international matches and also currently plays for Puneri Paltan in the Indian Pro Kabaddi League.

== Career ==
He was part of the Iranian team which claimed silver in the men's team event at the 2014 Asian Games. He narrowly missed out to participate at the 2018 Asian Games where historically Iran claimed gold medal for the first time. However he made into the national side for the 2018 Dubai Kabaddi Masters and claimed silver medal with the team after losing to rivals India by 44–26 in the final.

=== Pro Kabaddi League ===
He made his PKL debut for U Mumba in the third season which was held in 2016. Hadi was bought by UP Yoddha for the fifth season of the Pro Kabaddi League. He again returned to the U Mumba side for the sixth season. He was signed by Puneri Paltan for the 2019 Pro Kabaddi League.
