= Abouzar Mohajer =

Iranian kabaddi player

Abouzar Mohajer Mighani
Personal information
- Full name: Abozar Mohajermighani
- Nationality: Iranian
- Born: 19 May 1989 (age 37) Iran
- Occupation: Kabbadi Player

Sport
- Sport: Kabaddi
- Position: Defender
- League: Pro Kabaddi League
- Club: Bengal Warriors; Telugu Titans
- Team: Iran, Telugu Titans
Medal record
Representing Iran
Men's Kabaddi
Asian Games
Gold medal – first place	2018 Jakarta	Team
Silver medal – second place	2010 Guangzhou	Team

Abouzar Mohajer Mighani (born 19 May 1989) is an Iranian kabaddi player who currently plays for the Iran national kabaddi team and Bengal Warriors, in the Pro Kabaddi League.

== Early life ==
Abozar was a wrestler before pursuing kabaddi as a full-time profession. Owing to his performances for the national team, he was bought by the Gujarat Fortunegiants for Season 5 of the Pro Kabaddi League.

== Playing style ==
Abozar is a multifaceted defender who plays as Right Cover and Right Corner defender. He's nicknamed the ‘Smiling Assassin’ for his ability to pin down skillful opposition raiders with relative ease.

== Career ==
=== Season 5 ===
Abozar scored 66 tackle points in 24 matches in his debut season at a tackle strike rate of 56.03%. Abozar went on to deliver consistently for his side in his debut season and played a pivotal role for Gujrat Fortunegiants reaching the final in their debut season.

=== Season 6 ===
Abozar was snapped up by Telugu Titans for 76 lakhs for the sixth edition of the VIVO Pro Kabaddi League. He followed up his consistent performances in his second season scoring 56 tackle points in 21 matches at a tackle strike rate of 57.14%.

== Records and achievements ==
- Asian Games Gold (2018)
- Asian Games Silver (2010)
