= Suma Akhter =

Bangladeshi national women Kabaddi player

Medal record

Representing Bangladesh

Women's Kabaddi

Asian Games
Bronze medal – third place	2014 Incheon	Team

Suma Akhter (Bengali: সুমা আক্তার) is a Bangladeshi national women Kabaddi player who was part of the team that won the bronze medal at the 2014 Asian Games in Incheon.
