= Surjeet Kumar =

Indian kabaddi player

Sujeet Kumar
Personal information
- Nationality: Indian
- Born: June 1, 1990 India
- Occupation: Athlete
- Known for: Won Golden medal in 2014 AsianGames

Sport
- Sport: Kabaddi
Medal record
Representing India
Men's Kabaddi
Asian Games
| Gold medal – first place | 2014 Incheon | Team |

Surjeet Kumar (born 1 June 1990) is representative for India in the sport of Kabaddi. He was a member of the kabaddi team that won a gold medal in the 2014 Asian Games in Incheon.
