= Shabbir Ahmed (kabaddi) =

Pakistani kabaddi player (born 1983)

Medal record

Representing Pakistan

Men's Kabaddi

Asian Games
Bronze medal – third place	2014 Incheon	Team

Shabbir Ahmed (born 12 March 1983) is a Pakistani professional international Kabaddi player. He was a member of the Pakistan national kabaddi team that won the Asian Games bronze medal in 2014 at Incheon.
