= Fatema Akhter Poly =

Bangladeshi kabaddi player

Medal record

Representing Bangladesh

Women's Kabaddi

Asian Games
| Bronze medal – third place | 2010 Guangzhou | Team |
| Bronze medal – third place | 2014 Incheon | Team |

Fatema Akhter Poly (Bengali: ফাতেমা আক্তার পলি) is a Bangladeshi national women Kabaddi player who was part of the team that won the bronze medal at the 2010 Asian Games and 2014 Asian Games.
