= Shahnaz Parvin Maleka =

Bangladeshi kabaddi player

Medal record

Representing Bangladesh

Women's Kabaddi

Asian Games
Bronze medal – third place	2010 Guangzhou	Team
Bronze medal – third place	2014 Incheon	Team

Shahnaz Parvin Maleka (Bengali: শাহনাজ পারভীন মালেকা) is a Bangladeshi national women Kabaddi player who was part of the team that won the bronze medal at the 2010 Asian Games and 2014 Asian Games. She is the captain of national side.
