= Atif Waheed =

Pakistani kabaddi player (born 1988)

Medal record

Representing Pakistan

Men's Kabaddi

Asian Games
| Bronze medal – third place | 2010 Guangzhou | Team |
| Bronze medal – third place | 2014 Incheon | Team |

Atif Waheed (born 21 December 1988) is a Pakistani professional international Kabaddi player. He was a member of the Pakistan national kabaddi team that won the Asian Games bronze medals in 2010 in Guangzhou and in 2014 in Incheon.
