= Azmira Khatun Dola =

Bangladeshi kabaddi player

Medal record

Representing Bangladesh

Women's Kabaddi

Asian Games
Bronze medal – third place	2014 Incheon	Team

Azmira Khatun Dola (Bengali: আজমিরা খাতুন দোলা) is a Bangladeshi national women's Kabaddi player who was part of the team that won the bronze medal at the 2014 Asian Games.
