= Women's Kabaddi Challenge =

Defunct Kabaddi league in India

Women's Kabaddi Season
- Sport: Kabaddi
- Founded: 2016
- First season: 2016
- Folded: 2016
- Owner: Mashal Sports
- No. of teams: 3
- Country: India
- Venue: 7 locations
- Broadcaster: STAR Sports
- Sponsor: STAR Sports

Women's Kabaddi Challenge was a Kabaddi league in India started like Pro Kabaddi League for women. Three teams took part in inaugural season in 2016 and the league was played across seven cities in India. It was a test event and only one season was organised.

== Season 1 ==
The first season was played in 2016, from 28 June to 31 July and was broadcast by Star Sports in India. The final was scheduled along with men's version on 31 July.

Final was conducted between Storm Queen and Fire Birds. Storm Queens produced a last second turnaround to defeat Fire Birds 24-23 in the final.

== Venues and Teams ==
Three teams will take part in first season

- Fire Birds - Captain: Mamatha Poojari
- Ice Divas - Captain: Abhilasha Mhatre
- Storm Queens - Captain: Tejaswini Bai

There will be seven venues for first edition Bangalore, Delhi, Hyderabad, Jaipur, Kolkata, Mumbai and Pune

Locations of the 2016 Women's Kabaddi Challenge Venues

== See also ==
- Women's Kabaddi League
