= Hadi Oshtorak =

Iranian kabaddi player

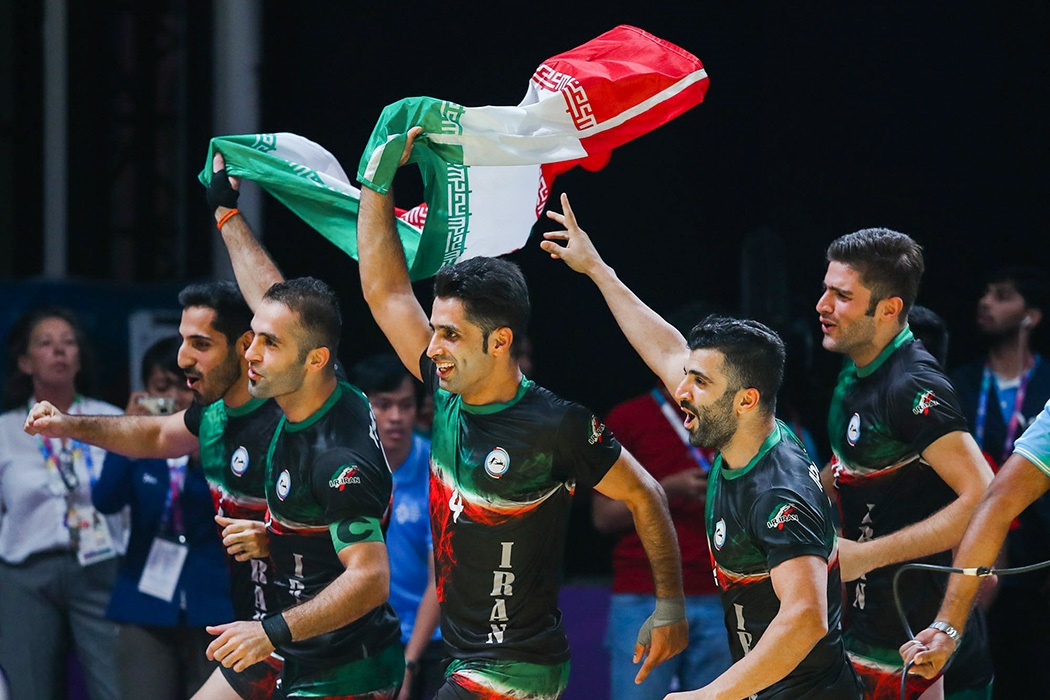
- Hadi Oshtorak in the middle celebrates the 2018 Asian Games glory with his teammates

Personal information
- Nationality: Iranian
- Born: 29 June 1992 (age 33) Gorgan, Iran

Sport
- Country: Iran
- Sport: kabaddi
- Position: allrounder
- League: Pro Kabaddi League
- Club: Telugu Titans; Gujarat Giants; U Mumba; Patna Pirates
- Team: Iran national kabaddi team
Medal record
Representing Iran
Men's Kabaddi
Asian Games
Gold medal – first place	2018 Jakarta-Palembang	team
Silver medal – second place	2014 Incheon	team
Asian Beach Games
Gold medal – first place	2014 Patong Beach	team
Bronze medal – third place	2010 Muscat	team
Kabaddi World Cup
Silver medal – second place	2016 Ahmedabad	team

Hadi Oshtorak (Persian: هادی اشترک, born 29 June 1992) is an Iranian kabaddi player that represents Iran in international matches and also currently plays for Gujarat Giants in the Indian Pro Kabaddi League. He is regarded as one of the finest all rounders in the Pro Kabaddi League scoring over 50 points.

== Career ==
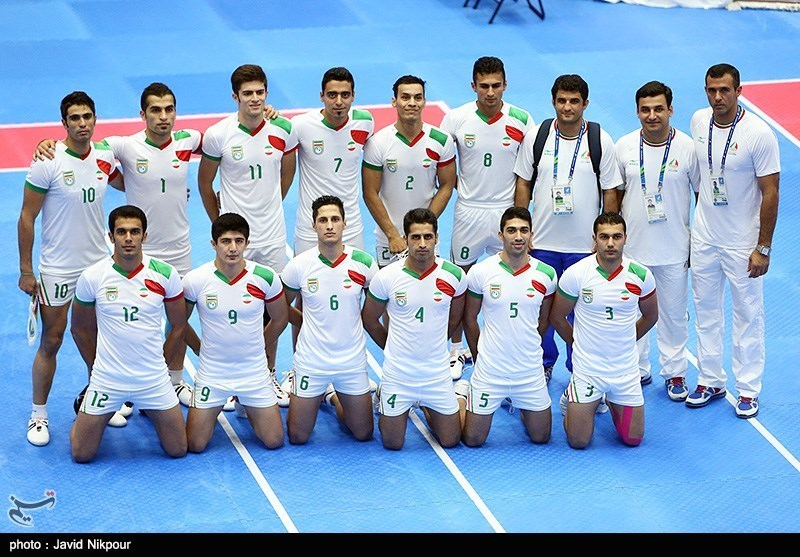
Hadi Oshtorak along with teammates pose with their gold medals after Asian Games triumph

He was part of the Iranian squad for the 2018 Asian Games and also played a crucial role in winning historic gold medal in the men's kabaddi team event. He was also a member of the Iranian team which claimed silver medal at the 2014 Asian Games and was also a key member of the national team which emerged as runners-up to India at the 2016 Kabaddi World Cup.

=== Pro Kabaddi League ===
He made his PKL debut for Telugu Titans in season two of the Pro Kabaddi League in 2015. He was then bought by the Patna Pirates for the season three and was part of the Patna Pirates squad which emerged as winners of the 2016 Pro Kabaddi League season. Hadi later signed with U Mumba in 2017 for the fifth season and again returned to Patna Pirates team for the sixth season in 2018.
