= Farzana Akhter Baby =

Bangladeshi kabaddi player

Medal record

Representing Bangladesh

Women's Kabaddi

Asian Games
Bronze medal – third place	2010 Guangzhou	Team
Bronze medal – third place	2014 Incheon	Team

Farzana Akhter Baby (Bengali: ফারজনা আক্তার বেবী) is a Bangladeshi national women Kabaddi player who was part of the team that won the bronze medal at the 2010 Asian Games and 2014 Asian Games.
