= Parveen Kumar (kabaddi) =

Indian kabaddi player

Medal record

Representing India

Men's Kabaddi

Asian Games
Gold medal – first place	2014 Incheon	Team

Parveen Kumar (born 7 May 1983) is representative for India in the sport of Kabaddi. He was a member of the kabaddi team that won a gold medal in the 2014 Asian Games in Incheon.
