= Kazi Shahin Ara =

Bangladeshi kabaddi player

Medal record

Representing Bangladesh

Women's Kabaddi

Asian Games
Bronze medal – third place	2010 Guangzhou	Team
Bronze medal – third place	2014 Incheon	Team

Kazi Shahin Ara (Bengali: কাজী শাহীন আরা) is a Bangladeshi national women's kabaddi player who was part of the team that won the bronze medal at the 2010 Asian Games and 2014 Asian Games.
