= Aqeel Hassan =

Pakistani Kabaddi player (born 1988)

Medal record

Representing Pakistan

Men's Kabaddi

Asian Games
Bronze medal – third place	2014 Incheon	Team

Syed Aqeel Hassan (born 4 August 1988) is a Pakistani professional international Kabaddi player. He was a member of the Pakistan national kabaddi team that won the Asian Games bronze medal in 2014 at Incheon.
