= Rajaguru Subramanian =

Indian kabaddi player

Medal record

Representing India

Men's Kabaddi

Asian Games
Gold medal – first place	2014 Incheon	Team

Rajaguru Subramanian he is Tamil Nadu born Kabaddi player, born 22 June 1987 is representative for India in the sport of Kabaddi. He was a member of the kabaddi team that won a gold medal in the 2014 Asian Games in Incheon.He was the captain of Telugu titans in season 1 pro kabaddi league.He has also played in Pkl (Pro Kabaddi League) In season 6 for U Mumba, now he is promoted by u mumba as a head coach now he is the new coach for u mumba to pro kabaddi season 8.
