= Priyanka Pilaniya =

Indian kabaddi player

Personal information
- Nationality: Indian

Sport
- Sport: Kabaddi
Medal record
Women's Kabaddi
Representing India
Asian Games
Gold medal – first place	2014 Incheon	Women's team
Gold medal – first place	2022 Hangzhou	Women's team

Priyanka Pilaniya is an Indian kabaddi player. She was part of the Indian teams that won the gold medal at the 2014 and 2022 Asian Games.
