= Anita Mavi =

Indian kabaddi player

Medal record

Representing India

Women's Kabaddi

Asian Games
Gold medal – first place	2014 Incheon	Team

Anita Mavi is an Indian professional kabaddi player. She was a member of the India national kabaddi team that won Asian games gold medals in 2014 in Incheon.
