= Shila Akhter =

Bangladeshi kabaddi player

Medal record

Representing Bangladesh

Women's Kabaddi

Asian Games
Bronze medal – third place	2014 Incheon	Team
Bronze medal – third place	2014 Incheon	Team

Shila Akhter (Bengali: শিলা আক্তার) is a Bangladeshi national women Kabaddi player who was part of the team that won the bronze medal at the 2014 Asian Games and 2014 Asian Games.
