= Lee Jang-kun =

South Korean professional Kabaddi player (born 1992)

Personal information
- Native name: 이장군
- Nickname: Babumoshai of Bengal/General
- Nationality: South Korean
- Citizenship: South Korean
- Born: 6 November 1992 (age 33) Busan, South Korea
- Education: Dong-eui University; Dong-a University (M.Ed.)
- Occupation: Kabaddi Player
- Years active: 2011–(present)
- Height: 1.84 m (6 ft 0 in)
- Weight: 82 kg (181 lb)
- Spouse: Lee Aeng-ja (m. 2022)

Sport
- Country: South Korea
- Sport: Kabaddi
- Position: Raider
- Kabaddi: Pro Kabaddi League
- Team: Bengal Warriorz (2014–2019); Patna Pirates (2019); Patna Pirates (2024); Bengal Warriorz (2025)
- Turned pro: 2014
Medal record
Asian Games
Silver medal – second place	2018 Jakarta	Men
Bronze medal – third place	2014 Incheon	Men
World Cup
Bronze medal – third place	2016 Ahmadabad	Team
Asian Indoor and Martial Arts Games
Bronze medal – third place	2013 Incheon	Men

Lee Jang-kun (Korean: 이장군) is a former South Korean professional Kabaddi player and television personality. He is the first overseas player in the Pro Kabaddi League to score 400 raid points. He became the most valuable international player in the fifth season after he was retained by Bengal Warriorz and has played for the same franchise until the sixth season. He joined Patna Pirates in the seventh season. He is the most successful foreign raider in the history of the Pro Kabaddi League.

== Career ==
Lee started his kabaddi career at the age of 18 when he was preparing for physical education studies at college. In two years, he was selected for the South Korean national kabaddi team as a junior at Dong-eui University.

After winning bronze as a member of the national team at the 2013 Asian Indoor and Martial Arts Games, Lee captured his first top-level international medal at the 2014 Asian Games where South Korea clinched bronze in the men's kabaddi tournament. After the Asian Games, Lee moved to India to join the Pro Kabaddi League. He became a valuable player for his team afterwards. Lee has not returned to the league after skipping the eighth season for personal reasons.

Till now in Pro Kabaddi League, Lee has played 11 seasons. In which, has scored 472 raid points and 25 tackle points including 9 super 10.

Lee was the most valuable foreign player in 2017 Pro Kabaddi League after he was retained by Bengal Warriors for 80.3 Lakhs.

In season 11, he made his comeback from Patna Pirates after being bought for 17.50 Lakhs.

In season 12, bengal warriorz bought him for 13 lakhs.

== Career statistics ==
League	Team	Season	Year	Matches	Raid points	Super 10s	Tackle points	Total points
Pro Kabaddi League	Bengal Warriorz	I	2014	11	55	2	2	57
Pro Kabaddi League	Bengal Warriorz	II	2015	14	48	1	2	50
Pro Kabaddi League	Bengal Warriorz	III	2016 January	15	79	2	11	90
Pro Kabaddi League	Bengal Warriorz	IV	2016 (June)	11	61	2	4	65
Pro Kabaddi League	Bengal Warriorz	V	2017	21	89	0	0	89
Pro Kabaddi League	Bengal Warriorz	VI	2018	18	79	2	3	82
Pro Kabaddi League	Patna Pirates	VII	2019	16	60	0	3	63
Pro Kabaddi League	Patna Pirates	XI	2024	1	1	0	0	1
Pro Kabaddi League	Bengal Warriorz	XII	2025	1	2	0	0	2
Total				108	474	9	25	499

== Records and achievements ==
Patna Pirates

- Pro Kabaddi League runner-up: 2024

== Filmography ==
=== Television shows ===
Year	Title	Network	Role	Notes
2021	Three Park: The Second Heart	MBC	Guest	Episode 10
2021–2023	The Gentlemen's League 2	JTBC/Netflix	Cast Member	
2022	King of Mask Singer	MBC	Contestant as "Ice Prince"	Episode 339
2022	Super DNA - Blood Can't Cheat	Channel A	Guest/Special Appearance	Episode 10
2022	King of Wrestling	ENA	Cast Member/ Wrestler	
2023	The Gentlemen's League 3	JTBC/Netflix	Cast Member	Episode 1-32
2025–present	The Gentlemen's League 4	JTBC	Cast Member	
2026	Battle of Fates	Disney+	Guest/Special Appearance	Episode 3

=== Web shows ===
Year	Title	Network	Role	Notes
2024	Physical: 100 Season 2 - Underground	Netflix	Contestant	
