= Lakshman Singh Jayanthi =

Indian kabaddi player

Medal record

Representing India

Women's Kabaddi

Asian Games
Gold medal – first place	2014 Incheon	Team

Lakshman Singh Jayanthi is an Indian professional kabaddi player. She was member of the India national kabaddi team that won the Asian Games gold medals in 2014 in Incheon.
