= Pooja Thakur (kabaddi) =

Indian kabaddi player

Medal record

Representing India

Women's Kabaddi

Asian Games
Gold medal – first place	2014 Incheon	Women's team

Pooja Thakur (born 24 February 1990) is an Indian professional international kabaddi player. She was a member of the India national kabaddi team that won the Asian Games gold medal in 2014 in Incheon.
