= Sushmita Pawar =

Indian kabaddi player

Medal record

Representing India

Women's Kabaddi

Asian Games
Gold medal – first place	2014 Incheon	Team

Sushmita Pawar is an Indian professional international kabaddi player from Mysuru City in Karnataka State. She was member of the India national kabaddi team that won the gold medal at the 2014 Asian Games in Incheon.
