= Kavita Devi (kabaddi) =

Indian professional kabaddi player

Medal record

Representing India

Women's Kabaddi

Asian Games
Gold medal – first place	2014 Incheon	Team

Kavita Devi (born 10 August 1990) is an Indian professional kabaddi player. She was a member of the India national kabaddi team that won the women's kabaddi gold medal at the 2014 Asian Games held in Incheon.
