= Mita Khatun =

Bangladeshi kabaddi player

Medal record

Representing Bangladesh

Women's Kabaddi

Asian Games
Bronze medal – third place	2014 Incheon	Team

Mita Khatun (Bengali: মিতা খাতুন) is a Bangladeshi national women Kabaddi player who was part of the team that won the bronze medal at the 2014 Asian Games.
