= Ibrar Hussain (kabaddi) =

Pakistani kabaddi player

Medal record

Representing Pakistan

Men's Kabaddi

Asian Games
Bronze medal – third place	2010 Guangzhou	Team
Bronze medal – third place	2014 Incheon	Team

Ibrar Hussain born 20 April 1984 is a Pakistani professional international Kabaddi player. He was a member of the Pakistan national kabaddi team that won Asian Games bronze medals in 2010 in Guangzhou and in 2014 in Incheon.
