= Surjeet Singh Narwal =

Indian kabaddi player

Personal information
- Nationality: Indian
- Born: 10 August 1990 (age 36)

Sport
- Sport: Kabaddi
- League: Pro Kabaddi League
- Team: U Mumba (2016); Bengal Warriors (2017-2018); Puneri Paltan (2016,2019); Tamil Thalaivas (2021); Telugu Titans (2022); Bengaluru Bulls (2023); Jaipur Pink Panthers (2024); Dabang Delhi (2025-present)
Medal record
Men's Kabaddi
Representing India
Asian Games
| Gold medal – first place | 2022 Hangzhou | Team |
| Gold medal – first place | 2014 Incheon | Team |
Commonwealth Kabaddi Championship
| Gold medal – first place | 2026 Amdavad | Team |

Surjeet Singh Narwal (born 10 August 1990) is an Indian kabaddi player. He was a member of the kabaddi team who won a gold medal in the 2014 Asian Games in Incheon, South Korea.He was a former captain of the team Puneri Paltan. He was also a part of Telugu Titans in Pro Kabaddi season 9. He also former captain of Bengaluru Bulls in Pro Kabaddi season 10.

He was part of the Indian kabaddi team who won a gold medal at the 2022 Asian Games where they defeated Iran to 33–29 in a controversial final faceoff.
