= Nitin Madane =

Indian kabaddi player

Medal record

Representing India

Men's Kabaddi

Asian Games
Gold medal – first place	2014 Incheon	Team

Nitin Madane is representative for India in the sport of Kabaddi. He was a member of the kabaddi team that won a gold medal in the 2014 Asian Games in Incheon.
