= Kavita Thakur =

Indian kabaddi player

Medal record

Representing India

Women's Kabaddi

Asian Games
| Gold medal – first place | 2014 Incheon | Team |
| Silver medal – second place | 2018 Jakarta | Team |

Kavita Thakur (born 10 January 1993) is a kabaddi player from Jagatsukh, Manali, Himachal Pradesh, India. She was a member of the team that won a gold medal in the 2014 Asian Games in Incheon.
