= South Korea national kabaddi team =

Sports team of South Korea

South Korea
- Association: Korea Kabaddi Association
- Confederation: Asian Kabaddi Federation (AKF)
- Head Coach: Cho Jae-ho
- Captain: Lee Jang-kun

World Cup
- 3 (first in 2004)
- (bronze) 3rd (2016)

Asian Games
- 5 (first in 2010)
- (silver) 2nd (2018)

Asian Championship
- 2 (first in 2017)
- (bronze) 3rd (2017)
Medal record
Event	1st	2nd	3rd
World Cup	0	0	1
Asian Games	0	1	1
Asian Championship	0	0	1
Total	0	1	3
World Cup
Bronze medal – third place	2016 India	
Asian Games
Silver medal – second place	2018 Jakarta	
Bronze medal – third place	2014 Incheon	
Asian Championship
Bronze medal – third place	2017 Iran	

The South Korea national kabaddi team (also known as Republic of Korea national kabaddi team) represents South Korea in international men's kabaddi competitions. Governed by the Korea Kabaddi Association, the team has won a silver medal (2018) and a bronze medal (2014) at the Asian Games and a bronze medal at the 2016 Kabaddi World Cup.

Kabaddi is a growing sport in South Korea. South Korea national team is ranked 3rd in the world.

== History ==
In 2016 Kabaddi World Cup, South Korea finished at 3rd place losing to Iran in the semi-finals. South Korea was the only team to beat eventual winner India in the entire tournament.

South Korea was also invited to participate in 2018 Dubai Kabaddi Masters, being one of the top 4 Kabaddi nations in the world. The team's raiders, including Lee Jang-kun and Park Hyun-il, and Hong Dong-ju, performed well at the tournament.

At the 2018 Asian Games in Jakarta, South Korea beat India 24–23 in the group stage, the first defeat for India in the history of kabaddi at the Games, and went on to win the silver medal, the team's best finish at the Games.

South Korea did not progress beyond the group stage at the 2022 Asian Games, finishing seventh with three defeats. At the 2026 Asian Games in Aichi–Nagoya the team, captained by Lee Jang-kun, lost all four of its Group A matches, to Bangladesh (35–39), India (31–63), Chinese Taipei (37–43) and Japan (35–62), and finished ninth.

== Tournament records ==
*Red border indicates that the tournament was hosted on home soil. Gold, silver, bronze backgrounds indicate 1st, 2nd and 3rd finishes respectively. Bold text indicates best finish in tournament.

=== Asian Games ===
Men's team

Year	Rank	M	W	D	L
(China) 1990	Did not enter				
(Japan) 1994	Did not enter				
(Thailand) 1998	Did not enter				
(South Korea) 2002	Did not enter				
(Qatar) 2006	Did not enter				
(China) 2010	5th	2	0	0	2
(South Korea) 2014	**Third place**	4	2	0	2
(Indonesia) 2018	**Second place**	6	5	0	1
(China) 2022	7th	3	0	0	3
(Japan) 2026	9th	4	0	0	4
Total	5/10	19	7	0	12

==== 2026 Asian Games results ====
Date	Round	Opponent	Score
21 September 2026	Group A	Bangladesh	35–39
22 September 2026	Group A	India	31–63
23 September 2026	Group A	Chinese Taipei	37–43
24 September 2026	Group A	Japan	35–62

=== World Cup ===
Men's Team

Year	Rank	Pld	W	D	L
(India) 2004	Group stage	3	1	0	2
(India) 2007	Group stage	3	1	0	2
(India) 2016	**Third place**	6	5	0	1
Total	3/3	12	7	0	5

== Current squad ==
The following 12 players were named for the 2026 Asian Games, with Lee Jang-kun as captain.

Name	Role
Lee Jang-kun (Captain)	Raider
Kim Dong-gyu	Defender
Kim Keon-myeong	
Lee Dong-geon	Raider
Choi Jong-hoon	
Kim Ju-hwan	
Byeon Min-soo	
Jang Hyung-jin	
Kim Dong-woo	
Kim Han-eol	
Heo Hyun-min	
Ku Ji-won	

=== Former players ===
The following players appeared in an earlier listing of the squad but were not named for the 2026 Asian Games.

- Shin Cheol-gyu
- Park Hyun-il
- Lee Jae-min
- Lee Jae-cheol
- Ko Young-chang
- Hong Dong-ju
- Park Chan-sik
- Kim Gyung-tae
- Kim Seong-ryeol
- Eom Tae-deok
- Kim Tae-beom
- Ok Yong-joo

== International grounds ==
Locations of stadiums which have hosted international kabaddi matches in South Korea

Stadium	City	Province	Capacity	Matches hosted	Notes
Songdo Global University Gymnasium	Incheon	Incheon Metropolitan City	2,000	2014 Asian Games, international friendlies	Hosted kabaddi events during the 2014 Asian Games; top venue for South Korea
Gimcheon Gymnasium	Gimcheon	North Gyeongsang Province	1,500	Training camps, friendly matches	Used for national team training and kabaddi promotional events
