= Muhammad Rizwan (kabaddi) =

Pakistani kabaddi player (born 1989)

Medal record

Representing Pakistan

Men's Kabaddi

Asian Games
Bronze medal – third place	2014 Incheon	Team

Muhammad Rizwan (born 6 April 1989) is a Pakistani professional international Kabaddi player. He was a member of the Pakistan national kabaddi team that won the Asian Games bronze medal in 2014 at Incheon.
