= Waseem Sajjad =

Pakistani kabaddi player (born 1983)

Medal record

Representing Pakistan

Men's Kabaddi

Asian Games
Silver medal – second place	2006 Doha	Team
Bronze medal – third place	2010 Guangzhou	Team
Bronze medal – third place	2014 Incheon	Team

Waseem Sajjad (born 11 February 1983) is a Pakistani professional international Kabaddi player who hails from the village of Balochni (Chak No. 60 RB) in the Faisalabad District of Punjab, Pakistan.. He was a member of silver medal-winning Pakistan national kabaddi team at the 2006 Asian Games in Doha and the bronze winning team at the 2010 Asian Games in Guangzhou and 2014 Asian Games in Incheon.
