= Jasvir Singh (kabaddi) =

Indian kabaddi player

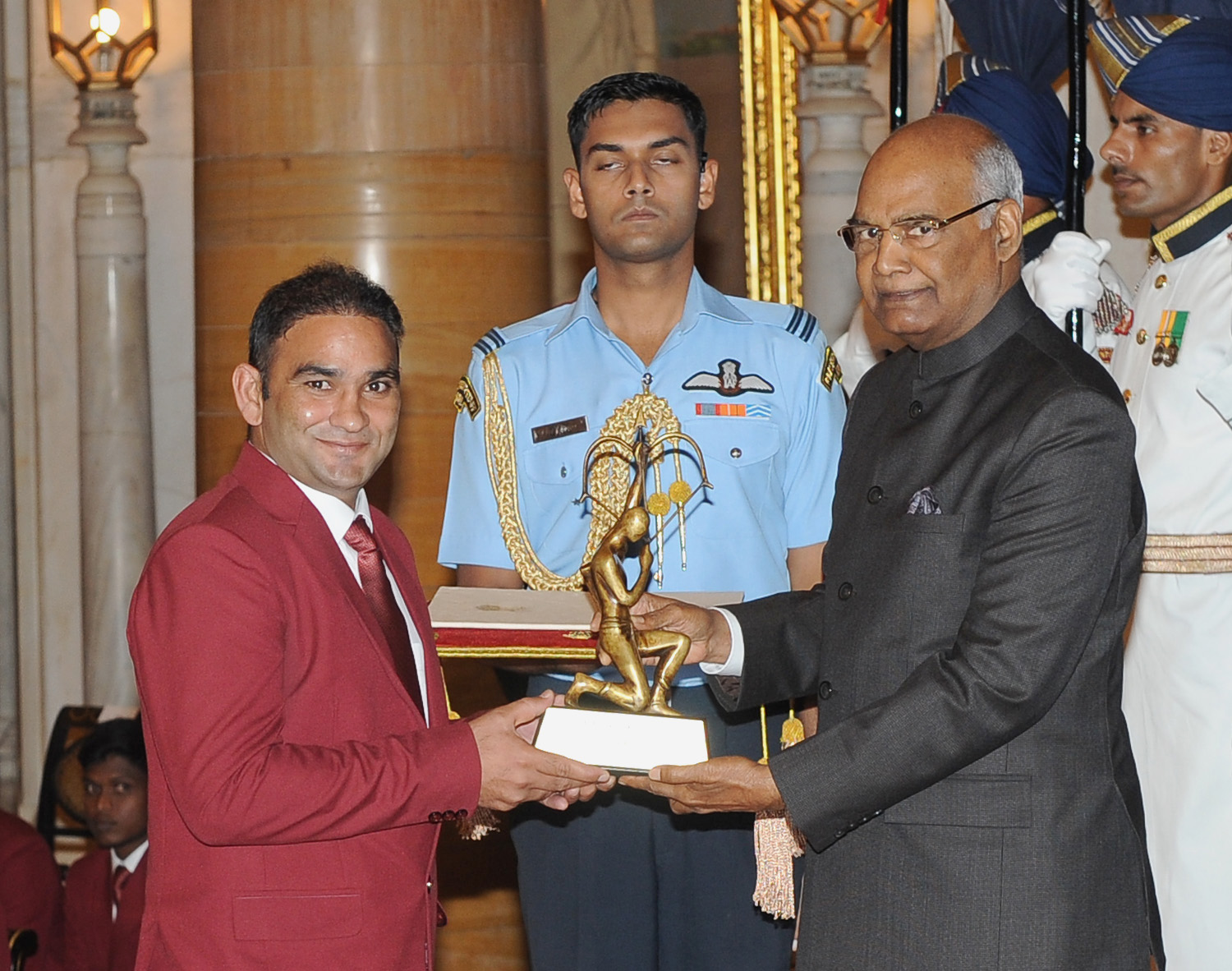
- Jasvir Singh (on the left)

Personal information
- Nickname: Nawab
- Nationality: Indian
- Citizenship: Indian
- Born: 4 April 1984 (age 42) Panipat, Haryana, India
- Occupation: Kabaddi Player
- Years active: 2007–present

Sport
- Country: India
- Sport: Kabaddi
- Position: Raider
- Kabaddi: Pro Kabaddi League
- Club: Jaipur Pink Panthers(2014–2018); Tamil Thalaivas(2018–present)
- Team: India national kabaddi team
- Coached by: Kasinatha Baskaran; Balwan Singh
Medal record
Representing India
Kabaddi World Cup
Winner	2016 Kabaddi World Cup
Asian Games
Gold medal – first place	2014 Incheon	Team

Jasvir Singh (born 4 April 1984) is an Indian professional Kabaddi player. He was a member of the India national kabaddi team that won Asian Games Gold medal in 2014 and World Cup in 2016. He hails from Panipat and serves in the Oil and Natural Gas Corporation (ONGC). He serves as fire safety officer.

== Early life ==
He was born on 4 April 1984 in Panipat, Haryana, India.

== Pro Kabaddi League ==
He played for Jaipur Pink Panthers in the Pro Kabaddi League from season 1 to season 5. In season 6, he played for Tamil Thalaivas.

== World Cup 2016 and Awards ==
Jasvir Singh was a member of the gold medal-winning team at the 2016 Kabaddi World Cup. He awarded the Arjuna award in 2017 For his excellence in the game of Kabbadi.
