= V. Tejeswini Bai =

Indian kabaddi player

Medal record

Representing India

Women's Kabaddi

Asian Games
Gold medal – first place	2010 Guangzhou	Team

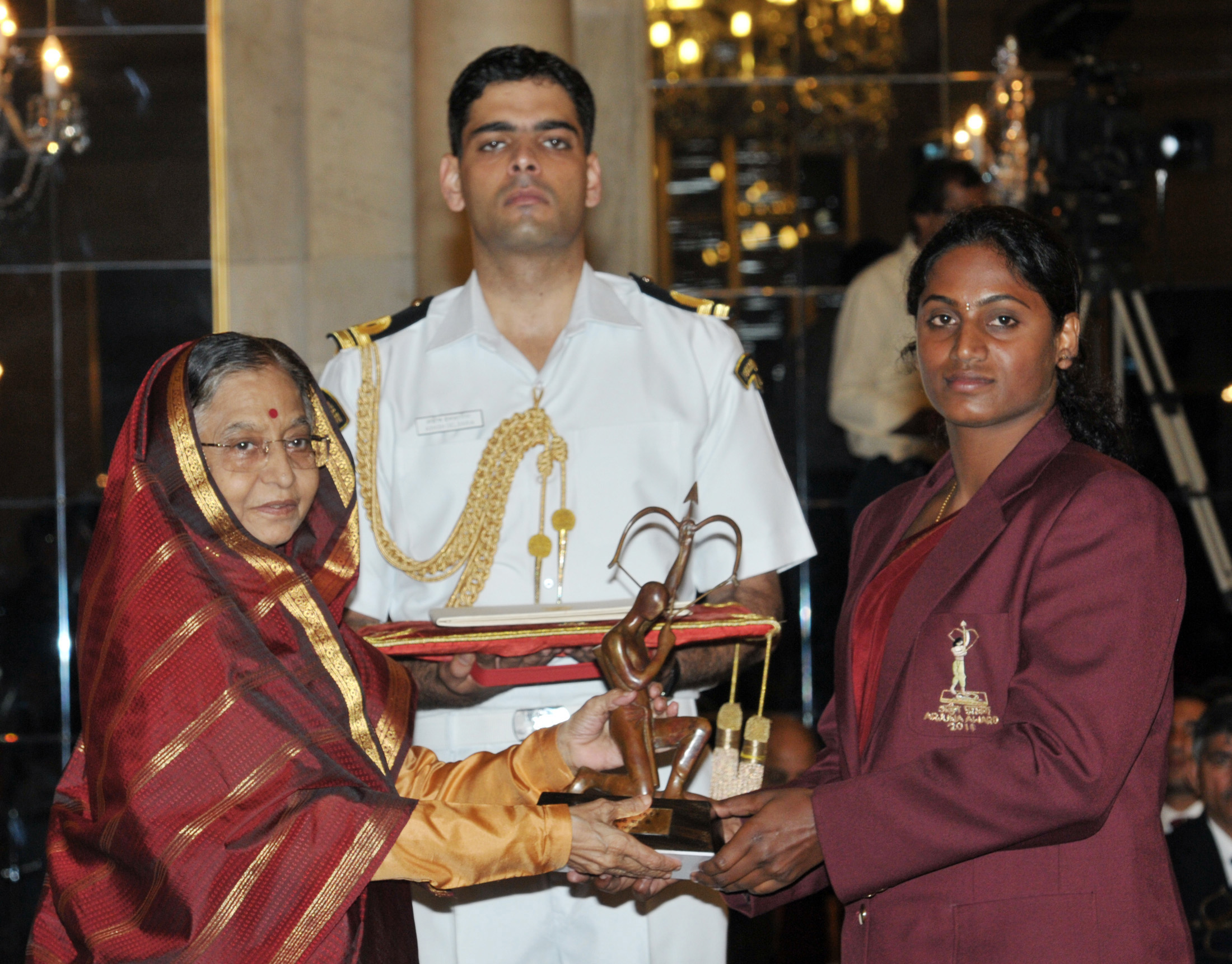
The President, Smt. Pratibha Devisingh Patil presenting the Arjuna Award for the year-2011 to Ms. Tejeswini Bai V. for Kabaddi (Women), in a glittering ceremony, at Rashtrapati Bhavan, in New Delhi on August 29, 2011.

V. Tejeswini Bai is an Indian kabaddi player. She was a member of the kabaddi team that won a gold medal at the 2010 Asian Games in Guangzhou.
