= Meraj Sheykh =

Iranian professional kabaddi player (born 1988)

Personal information
- Nicknames: Cheetah, Magician Meraj
- Born: 26 May 1988 (age 38) Sistan, Iran
- Years active: 2014-present
- Height: 175 cm (5 ft 9 in)
- Weight: 75 kg (165 lb)

Sport
- Country: Iran
- Sport: Kabaddi
- Position: All-Rounder
- Kabaddi: Pro Kabaddi League
- Club: Telugu Titans; Dabang Delhi
- Team: Iran National Kabaddi Team

Meraj Sheykh (born 26 May 1988) is an Iranian professional kabaddi player who last played for Dabang Delhi. He holds the first position for all-rounders in Pro Kabaddi League’s all-time scoring charts. His signature move – the Scorpion Kick – further accentuates his sharp reflexes and flexibility. The move requires a raider to turn towards the mid-line and then snap his back knee up to pick up a touch on a defender on the way back, similar to the sting of a scorpion.

== Early life ==
He was born in Iran and began playing at a young age. Before playing Kabaddi, Sheykh was a professional wrestler for 10 years.

== Kabaddi career ==
VIVO Pro Kabaddi

=== Season 2 ===
He made his debut in Season 2 with Telugu Titans and became the first foreign player to captain a Pro Kabaddi side when he was selected as their skipper for the second half of the campaign. Sheykh scored 29 raid points and 9 tackle points in his first season with the Titans.

=== Season 3 ===
Season 3 of Pro Kabaddi saw Sheykh score 27 raid points and 21 tackle points before changing allegiances in the following campaign.

=== Season 4 ===
The fourth edition of Pro Kabaddi witnessed Sheykh move to Dabang Delhi, where he was made captain. The Iranian all-rounder seemed to enjoy the added responsibility and scored 63 raid points as well as 12 tackle points.

=== Season 5 ===
Season 5 was Sheykh's most successful in terms of points return. He scored 96 raid points, 8 tackle points and also completed 50 tackle points in league history. His total of 104 points made him the best all-rounder in the fifth edition of Pro Kabaddi.

=== Season 6 ===
In the sixth season, Sheykh continued to raid with great success and scored 94 raid points. However, the Iranian only managed 3 tackle points from 19 matches.

Iran Kabaddi team

He represented his country in the 2016 Kabaddi World Cup final, where they finished runners-up to India.
