= Abhilasha Mhatre =

Indian kabaddi player

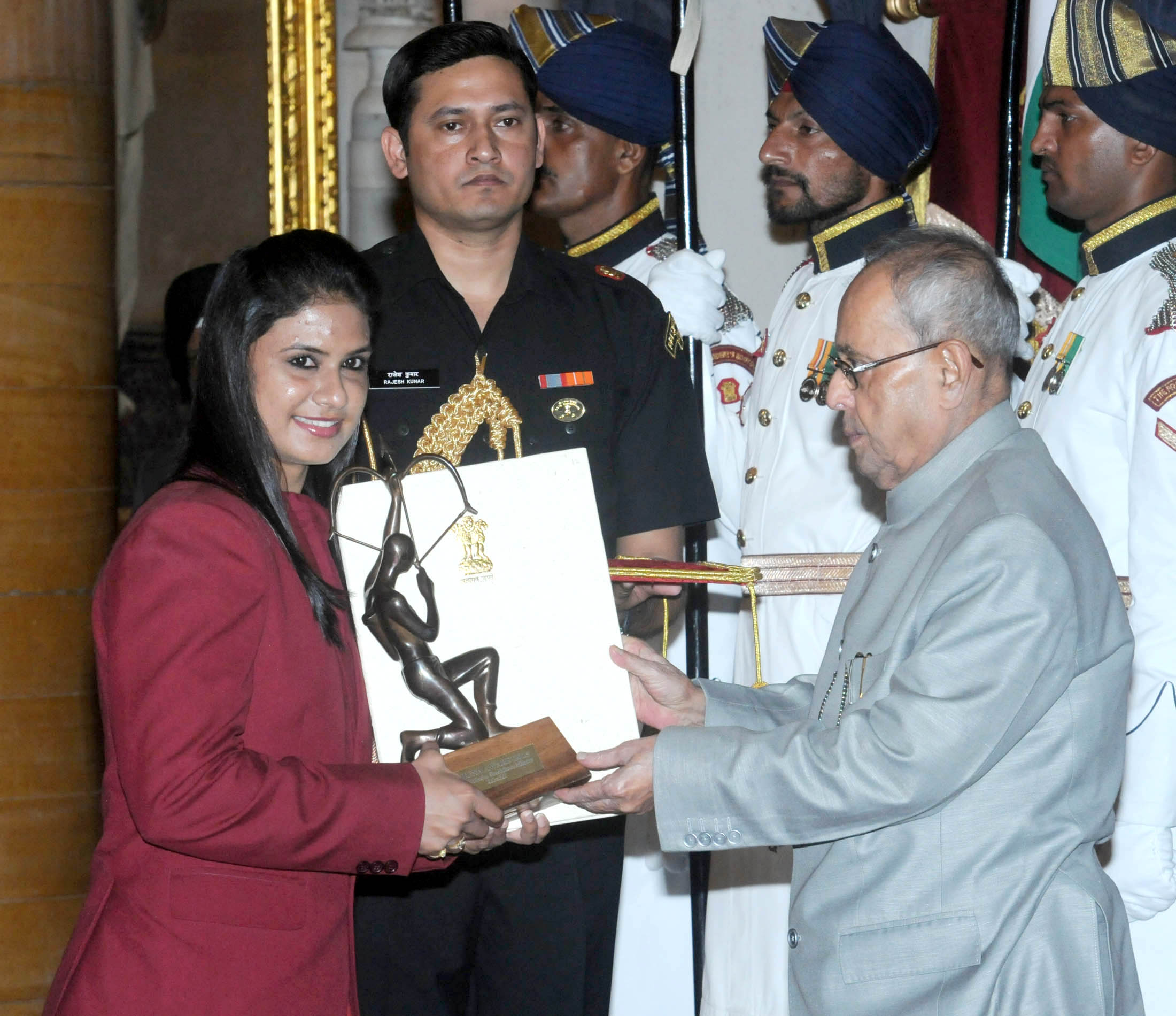
- Abhilasha Mhatre receiving the Arjuna Award

Personal information
- Full name: Abhilasha Shashikant Mhatre
- Nationality: Indian
- Born: Abhilasha Mhatre; 28 November 1987 (age 38) Pune, Maharashtra, India
- Occupation: Kabaddi Player
- Years active: from 1999 to till date
- Height: 170 cm (5 ft 7 in)
- Spouse: Rahul Patil

Sport
- Country: India
- Sport: Kabaddi
- Position: Raider
- League: Women's Kabaddi Challenge
- Club: Chembur Krida Kendra
- Team: 1. India, 2. Maharashtra, 3. Indian Railways, 4. Ice Divas
Medal record
Representing India
2006 South Asian Games
Gold medal – first place	2006 Sri Lanka	Team
2012 Women Kabaddi World Cup
Gold medal – first place	2012 Patna	Team
Asian Games
Gold medal – first place	2014 Incheon	Team
2016 South Asian Games
Gold medal – first place	2016 Guwahati	Team
Asian Kabaddi Championship
Gold medal – first place	2017 Gorgan	Team

Abhilasha Mhatre is an Indian professional kabaddi player and former captain of Indian national women's kabaddi team. She has won the Arjuna Award of Government of India in 2015. Known for her elegant footwork she is regarded as one of the finest kabaddi players in India. She is fondly referred as "Queen of Kabaddi". She was a member of the Indian kabaddi team that won the gold medal at the Asian Games in 2014 in Incheon, as well as at the Kabaddi World Cup in 2012 in Patna, India.

== Early career ==
Abhilasha studied at Swami Muktanand High School in Mumbai. She was in seventh grade when she started playing for the Chembur Krida Kendra club. Their practice ground was her school ground. Many renowned senior players of her club used to practice there, so she got to see big tournaments at a young age. After continuous excellent performances at national Level, her talent and hard work earned her a place in the Indian team in 2006 for the South Asian Games in Sri Lanka.

== Injuries and comeback ==
After representing India at the age of 17, Abhilasha suffered successive injuries in 2007 and 2008. Both her knees required operations, which kept her away from kabaddi. However she made a strong comeback in 2010 and won a gold medal in the 57th Senior National Kabaddi Championship, Dombivali. She was awarded as the best player of the tournament in 58th Senior National Kabaddi Championship, Udipi. Abhilasha recollected, "I had lost all hopes after my second injury. I thought this was it. My kabbadi career was over. But I made a comeback in 2010 and prove myself wrong". She played five major international events after her comeback.

== National career ==
Abhilasha Mhatre represented Maharashtra state kabaddi team for the first time in 2005. She led Maharashtra in the Senior National Kabaddi Championship at Hyderabad where Maharashtra won the silver medal. She was awarded the 'Best Player of the Tournament'. After her stint with Maharashtra she represented Indian Railways for more than five years and won five gold medals. She also won the 'Best Raider Award' in 2011 while representing Railways. She switched back to Maharashtra and currently is the regular member of team. She has played 10 Senior National Kabaddi Championships and has won 5 Gold Medals, 1 Silver Medal and 4 Bronze Medals.

== International career ==
She made her International debut in the South Asian Games in Sri Lanka in 2006, in which India won the gold medal. She missed the Asian Games of 2010 but regained her place in the Indian team in 2012. She played a vital role in 2012 Women's Kabaddi World Cup to win India the title. She was also the part of Indian squad that won gold medal in the 4th Asian Indoor and Martial Arts Games held in South Korea in 2013. In 2014, she represented India in the 17th Asian Games that took place in Incheon, South Korea and won the gold medal. She performed extremely well under pressure in final match against Iran to see India through to the victory. Abhilasha admitted, "Being a sportsperson, the one medal that I am very proud of is the Gold in Asian Games". She represented India in 2016 South Asian Games hosted by India clinching another gold medal. She was handed over the captaincy of the India team for the Asian Kabaddi Championship, 2017 hosted by Iran. The Indian team went on to win the tournament adding one more gold medal to her tally.

== Women's Kabaddi Challenge ==
Abhilasha Mhatre captained the team Ice Divas in the Women's Kabaddi Challenge, 2016 which was the professional league for Women like Pro Kabaddi League. Although her team did not win the title, Abhilasha did well in the league and was the second highest scorer of the tournament.

== Awards and achievements ==
1. Arjuna Award in 2015 by the Government of India
2. "Shiv Chhatrapati Krida Puraskar" in 2017 by the Government of Maharashtra
3. Gold Medal – 2006 South Asian Games, Sri Lanka
4. Winner-2012 Women's Kabaddi World Cup, Patna (India)
5. Gold Medal – 4th Asian Indoor and Martial Arts Games, 2013, South Korea
6. Gold Medal – 17th Asian Games, 2014, Incheon, South Korea
7. Gold Medal – 12th South Asian Games, 2016, Guwahati, Assam
8. Gold Medal – Asian Kabaddi Championship, 2017, Iran
9. "Best Player Award" – 53rd Senior National Kabaddi Championship, Hyderabad, 2005
10. "Best Player Award" – 24th Senior National Federation Cup, Manchar, Pune, 2005
11. "Best Raider Award" – 58th Senior National Kabaddi Championship, Udipi, Karnataka, 2011

== Personal life ==
She lives in Nerul, Navi Mumbai and is currently working as Sports Officer in Navi Mumbai Municipal Corporation.
