= Mamatha Poojary =

Indian kabaddi player

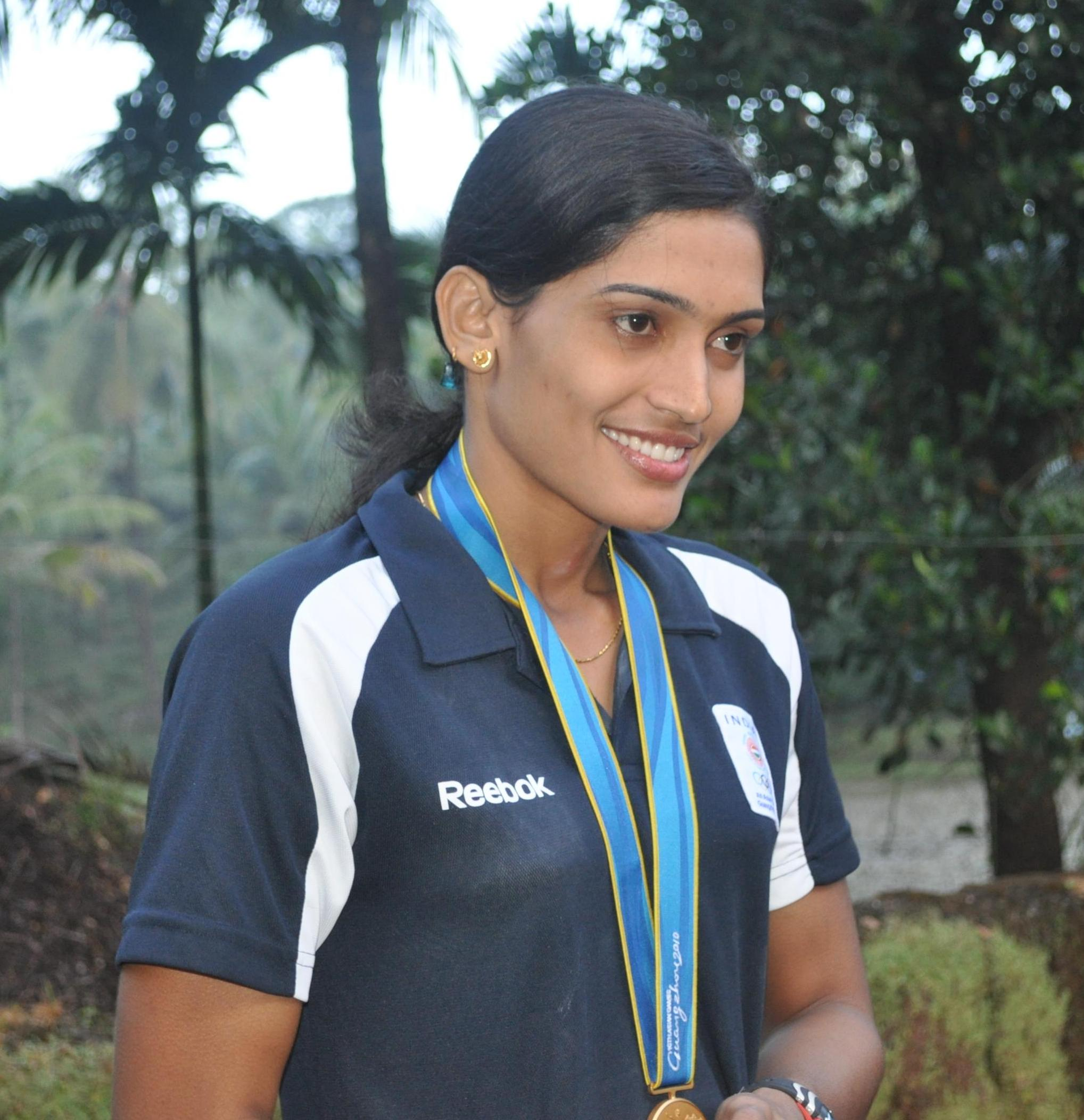
Poojary in 2010

Mamatha Poojary (born 1986) is an Indian professional international kabaddi player. She is a former captain of the Indian women's Kabaddi team and has been awarded the Rajyotsava Prashasti, the second-highest award of the Government of Karnataka. On 2 September 2014, she was conferred with the Arjuna Award by President Pranab Mukherjee in recognition of her achievements in Kabaddi.

== Early life ==
Mamatha Poojary was born in 1986 to a farmer Boja Poojary and Kitti Poojary in Karkala taluk, Udupi district, Karnataka. Her mother tongue is Tulu. She is currently employed by the South Central Railways Zone of Indian Railways. Mamatha finished her schooling in Hermunde and Ajekar and graduated from Shree Gokarnatheshwara College, Mangalore.

== Career ==
During her school days she was actively involved in sports like volleyball, short-put and kabaddi. But it was the passion for kabaddi that was a clincher. Her hunt for Awards set in motion when she represented Mangalore university at the international match held at tirunelveli. She won the gold medal. She also won medals in open kabaddi tournaments held at Hingaat and Dadar. Mamatha was a part of the Indian Kabaddi team that won Gold in the south Asia games held in Colombo in 2006.

List of medals.

Internationals:

1. Gold in the 17th Asian Games 2014 held in South Korea.

2. Gold as captain in the 4th Asian 2014 Beach Games held in Thailand.

3. Gold in the 16th Asian Games 2010 held in China.

4. Gold as captain in 1st World Cup held in Patna.

5. Gold in 4th Asian Indoor and martial games 2013 held in South Korea.

6. Gold as captain in the 1st Asian Beach Games 2008 held in Indonesia.

7. Gold as captain in the 2nd Asian Beach Games 2010 held in Oman.

8. Gold as captain in the 3rd Asian Beach Games held in China.

9. Gold in the 2nd Asian Kabaddi Championship 2007 held in Iran.

10. Gold in the 3rd Asian Kabaddi Championship 2008 held in Madurai.

11. Gold In 10th SAAF Games 2006 held in Sri Lanka.

Nationals:

1. Gold as Best Player 62nd Senior National Tirchingode Tamil Nadu 2015.

2. Gold 61st Senior National Patna Bihar 2014.

3. Gold 60th Senior National Mandya Karnataka 2013.

4. Gold and Best All Rounder 59th Senior National Mumbai Maharashtra 2012.

5. Gold as captain and Best All Rounder 58th Senior National Byndoor Karnataka 2011.

6. Gold 57th Senior National Mumbai Maharashtra 2010.

7. Gold and Best All Rounder 56th Senior National New Delhi Delhi 2008.

8. Gold 55th Senior National Amravathi Maharashtra 2007.

9. Gold 54th Senior National Chitoor Andhra Pradesh 2007.

10. Participation and Best Player 53rd Senior National Uppal Andhra Pradesh 2007.

11. Participation 52nd Senior National Kurukshetra Haryana 2004.

Her other achievements include medals at the

- Asian beach sports kabaddi match held at Baali
- Second Asian women's kabaddi championship held at Tehran of Iran
- Third women's kabaddi championship held in Chennai
- Kabaddi at the 2010 Asian Games in Guangzhou, China
- Indoor kabaddi at the 2013 Asian Indoor and Martial Arts Games.

As captain of the Indian women's kabaddi team, she led her team to victory in the finals of the inaugural 2012 world cup.

== External sources ==
- Facebook page
