= Abolfazl Maghsoudlou =

Iranian Kabaddi player (born 1992)

Personal information
- Full name: Abolfazl Maghsoudlou Mahalli
- Born: 7 August 1992 (age 33) Iran
- Years active: 2016-present
- Height: 188 cm (6 ft 2 in)

Sport
- Country: Iran
- Sport: Kabaddi
- Position: Raider
- Kabaddi: Pro Kabaddi League
- Club: Bengaluru Bulls; U Mumba; Patna Pirates; Dabang Delhi
- Team: Iran National Kabaddi Team
- Coached by: Dr. Ramesh Bhendigiri

Abolfazl Maghsoudlou (Persian: ابوالفضل مقصودلو, born 7 August 1992) is an Iranian professional Kabaddi player. He is currently playing for Bengaluru Bulls in Pro Kabaddi League Season 8.

== Early life ==
He was born in Golestan province of Iran.

== Pro Kabaddi League ==
He debut in PKL in Season 3 and played for U Mumba in Season 3, Patna Pirates in Season 4. He played for Dabang Delhi in Season 5.And currently he plays for Bengaluru Bulls.

== World Cup 2016 and awards ==
He played for Iran National team in the 2016 Kabaddi World Cup.
