= Nepal at the 2026 Asian Games =

- Flag of Nepal
- IOC code: NEP
- NOC: Nepal Olympic Committee
- Website: nocnepal.org.np

in Aichi–Nagoya, Japan 19 September 2026 – 4 October 2026
- Competitors: 136 in 22 sports
- Flag bearers: Chandra Bahadur Thapa; Manmati Bist
- Medals Ranked 36th: Gold 0 Silver 0 Bronze 2 Total 2

Asian Games appearances (overview)
- 1951; 1954; 1958; 1962; 1966; 1970; 1974; 1978; 1982; 1986; 1990; 1994; 1998; 2002; 2006; 2010; 2014; 2018; 2022; 2026

Nepal participated in the 2026 Asian Games in Nagoya, Aichi Prefecture, Japan from September 19 to October 4, 2026. This was the country's 17th consecutive appearance in the competition, having made its debut at the inaugural 1951 Asian Games. The Nepali contingent consists of 136 athletes competing in 22 sports. Chandra Bahadur Thapa and Manmati Bist were the nation's flag-bearers during the opening ceremony.

== Competitors ==
The Nepali contingent consisted of 136 athletes competing in 22 sports.

Sport	Men	Women	Total
Archery	1	1	2
Athletics	4	2	6
Badminton	2	2	4
Boxing	4	3	7
Canoeing	2	0	2
Cricket	15	0	15
Cycling	1	1	2
Esports	TBA	TBA	TBA
Golf	3	1	4
Judo	3	3	6
Kabaddi	12	12	24
Karate	3	5	8
Skateboarding	2	0	2
Soft tennis	3	1	4
Squash	1	1	2
Swimming	3	2	5
Table tennis	3	3	6
Taekwondo	2	1	3
Tennis	3	2	5
Volleyball	0	12	12
Wrestling	4	2	6
Wushu	7	3	10
Total	78	57	135

== Medal tally ==
Medal	Athlete	Sport	Event	Date
Bronze	Tenzing Sherpa	Karate	Men's kumite +84 kg	23 September
Bronze	Nepal women's national kabaddi team: Manmati Bist; Rabina Chaudhary; Jayanti Badu; Ganga Ghimire; Khim Maya Khatri; Manisha Joshi; Mina Nepali; Binita Pandit Chhetri; Nanu Maya Parajuli; Menuka Kumari Rajbanshi; Sirjana Kumari Tharu; Asma Yadav	Kabaddi	Women's tournament	25 September

Medals by events
Sport	Gold	Silver	Bronze	Total
Karate	0	0	1	1
Kabaddi	0	0	1	1
Total	0	0	2	2

Medals by day
Day	Date	Gold	Silver	Bronze	Total
1	20 September	0	0	0	0
2	21 September	0	0	0	0
3	22 September	0	0	0	0
4	23 September	0	0	1	1
5	24 September	0	0	0	0
6	25 September	0	0	1	1
7	26 September	0	0	0	0
8	27 September	0	0	0	0
Total		0	0	2	2

Medals by gender
Gender	Gold	Silver	Bronze	Total
Female	0	0	1	1
Male	0	0	1	1
Mixed	0	0	0	0
Total	0	0	2	2

Multiple medalists
Athlete	Event	1st place, gold medalist(s)	2nd place, silver medalist(s)	3rd place, bronze medalist(s)	Total
Player Name	Asian Games	0	0	0	0

== Archery ==
Recurve

Athlete	Event	Ranking round		Round of 48	Round of 32	Round of 16	Quarterfinals	Semifinals	Final / BM	
Athlete	Event	Score	Seed	Opposition Score	Opposition Score	Opposition Score	Opposition Score	Opposition Score	Opposition Score	Rank
Tilak Pun Magar	Men's individual	651	40	Did not advance						
Gyanu Awale	Women's individual	581	48	Did not advance						
Tilak Pun Magar; Gyanu Awale	Mixed team	1232	18	—N/a	United Arab Emirates; L 2–6	Did not advance				

== Athletics ==
Track events
Men

Athlete	Event	Heats		Semi-final		Final	
Athlete	Event	Result	Rank	Result	Rank	Result	Rank
Som Bahadur Kumal	800 m	1:48.95	5	—N/a		Did not advance	
Mukesh Bahadur Pal	1500 m	3:49.57	9	—N/a		Did not advance	
Mukesh Bahadur Pal	5000 m	—N/a				14:03.61	9
Rajan Rokaya	10000 m	—N/a				DNF	—

Women

Athlete	Event	Final	
Athlete	Event	Result	Rank
Purna Laxmi Neupane	1500 m	4:45.58	11
Purna Laxmi Neupane	5000 m	17:00.60	11
Santoshi Shrestha	5000 m	17:53.17	12
Santoshi Shrestha	10000 m	36:20.84	11

Road events

Athlete	Event	Final	
Athlete	Event	Result	Rank
Khadka Bahadur Khadka	Men's marathon	2:23:42	19

== Badminton ==
Singles

Athlete	Event	Round of 64	Round of 32	Round of 16	Quarterfinals	Semi-finals	Final	
Athlete	Event	Opposition Score	Opposition Score	Opposition Score	Opposition Score	Opposition Score	Opposition Score	Rank
Kshitiz Khanal	Men	Pui C C (MAC); W 2–0 (21–7, 21–18)	Nima (IRI); L 0–2 (14–21, 9–21)	Did not advance				
Praful Maharjan	Men	Dumindu (SRI); L 0–2 (6–21, 8–21)	Did not advance					
Rashila Maharjan	Women	—N/a	Wang ZY (CHN); L 0–2 (4–21, 2–21)	Did not advance				
Rihanna Sherchan	Women	—N/a	R Liyanage (SRI); L 0–2 (9–21, 6–21)	Did not advance				

Doubles

Athlete	Event	Round of 32	Round of 16	Quarterfinals	Semi-finals	Final	
Athlete	Event	Opposition Score	Opposition Score	Opposition Score	Opposition Score	Opposition Score	Rank
Kshitiz Khanal; Praful Maharjan	Men	W Koh / J Kubo (SGP); L 0–2 (13–21, 16–21)	Did not advance				
Rashila Maharjan; Rihanna Sherchan	Women	Kim H-j / Lee Y-w (KOR); L 0–2 (3–21, 5–21)	Did not advance				
Kshitiz Khanal; Rihanna Sherchan	Mixed	Jeong N-e / Jo S-h (KOR); L 0–2 (5–21, 6–21)	Did not advance				
Praful Maharjan; Rashila Maharjan	Mixed	Hong-wei / Nicole (TPE); L 0–2 (14–21, 9–21)	Did not advance				

== Boxing ==
Athlete	Event	Round of 32	Round of 16	Quarterfinals	Semifinals	Final	
Athlete	Event	Opposition Result	Opposition Result	Opposition Result	Opposition Result	Opposition Result	Rank
Chandra Bahadur Thapa	Men's 55 kg	Jadumani (IND); L 5–0	Did not advance				
Khagenra Roka Magar	Men's 60 kg	Salinas (MAC); W 5–0	Ogayre (PHI); L 5–0	Did not advance			
Dan Bahadur Darlami	Men's 70 kg	Al-Sarray (IRQ); L 5–0	Did not advance				
Rabin Nepal	Men's 90 kg	—N/a	Yomkhot (THA); L 5–0	Did not advance			
Ramisha Shrestha	Women's 51 kg	Thi Tam (VIE); L 5–0	Did not advance				
Asmita Duwal	Women's 54 kg	—N/a	Namiki (JPN); L 5–0	Did not advance			
Kusum Tamang	Women's 65 kg	Li Shu (CHN); L 5–0	Did not advance				

== Cricket ==
The Nepal men's cricket team qualified for the Asian Games through the men's qualifier. The Cricket Association of Nepal and the Nepal Olympic Committee announced a 15-member squad on 13 September 2026, captained by Dipendra Singh Airee and coached by Stuart Law. However, the Nepal women's cricket team failed to qualify for the tournament.

Team	Event	Group stage			Quarterfinal	Semifinal	Final / BM	
Team	Event	Opposition Score	Opposition Score	Rank	Opposition Score	Opposition Score	Opposition Score	Rank
Nepal men's	Men's tournament	Afghanistan; W by 5 wickets 103/5 (17.2)–102/7 (20)	Japan NR; 149/4 (15 overs)–DNB	1st	Sri Lanka; L NR	Did not advance		6

=== Men's tournament ===
Squad

Head coach: (Australia) Stuart Law

- Dipendra Singh Airee (c)
- Lokesh Bam (wk)
- Kushal Bhurtel
- Gulshan Jha
- Sundeep Jora
- Sompal Kami
- Karan KC
- Sandeep Lamichhane
- Kushal Malla
- Sher Malla
- Rohit Paudel
- Lalit Rajbanshi
- Aarif Sheikh
- Aasif Sheikh (wk)
- Nandan Yadav

==== Preliminary stage ====
Points table

Pos	Team	Pld	W	L	T	NR	Pts	NRR	Qualification
1	Nepal	2	1	0	0	1	3	0.842	Advanced to the knockout stage
2	Afghanistan	2	1	1	0	0	2	0.846	Advanced to the knockout stage
3	Japan (H)	2	0	1	0	1	1	−2.400	Eliminated

Source: Cricinfo
(H) Host

Fixtures

Match 3
25 September 2026
14:00
Scorecard

Afghanistan; 102/7 (20 overs)	v	Nepal; 103/5 (17.2 overs)
Faisal Shinozada 30 (33); Kushal Bhurtel 4/21 (4 overs)		Sundeep Jora 34 (35); Faridoon Dawoodzai 1/10 (3 overs)

Nepal won by 5 wickets
Kōrogi Sports Park, Nisshin
Umpires: Viswanadan Kalidas (Mas) and Gazi Sohel (Ban)

- Afghanistan won the toss and elected to bat.

Match 5
26 September 2026
09:00
Scorecard

Nepal; 149/4 (15 overs)	v	Japan
Sundeep Jora 57* (32); Reo Sakurano-Thomas 1/7 (2 overs)

No result
Kōrogi Sports Park, Nisshin
Umpires: Faisal Afridi (Pak) and Prageeth Rambukwella (SL)

- Japan won the toss and elected to field.
- The match was reduced to 15 overs per side due to rain.
- No further play was possible due to rain.

==== Knockout stage ====
Quarter-finals
28 September – Nisshin
Pakistan	Abandoned
Hong Kong	Abandoned
29 September – Nisshin
Bangladesh	Abandoned
Malaysia	Abandoned
28 September – Nisshin
Afghanistan	Abandoned
India	Abandoned
29 September – Nisshin
Nepal	Abandoned
Sri Lanka	Abandoned

Semi-finals
1 October – Nisshin
Pakistan	112/4 (11.3)
Bangladesh	111/7 (13)
1 October – Nisshin
India	169/7 (20)
Sri Lanka	45 (9.5)

Gold medal match
3 October – Nisshin
Pakistan (silver)	192/6 (20)
India (gold)	211/6 (20)
Bronze medal match
3 October – Nisshin
Bangladesh	102 (17.3)
Sri Lanka (bronze)	165/9 (20)

Quarterfinal 3
29 September 2026
09:00
Scorecard

Nepal	v	Sri Lanka

Match abandoned
Kōrogi Sports Park, Nisshin
Umpires: Nitin Menon (Ind) and Gazi Sohel (Ban)

- No toss.
- No play was possible due to rain.
- Sri Lanka advanced by virtue of being the higher-seeded team.

== Golf ==
Individual

Golfer	Event	Round 1	Round 2	Round 3	Round 4	Total		
Golfer	Event	Score	Score	Score	Score	Score	To Par	Rank
Sadbhav Acharya	Men	Withdrew						
Rahul Bishwakarma	Men	76	76	Cut		152	+12	T45
Subash Tamang	Men	70	67	71	72	280	E	23
Tara Karki	Women	91	94	Cut		185	+45	42

Team

Golfer	Event	Round 1	Round 2	Round 3	Round 4	Total		
Golfer	Event	Score	Score	Score	Score	Score	To Par	Rank
Sadbhav Acharya; Rahul Bishwakarma; Subash Tamang	Men	146	143	Cut		289	+9	14

== Judo ==
Athlete	Event	Round of 32	Round of 16	Quarterfinals	Semifinals	Repechage	Final / BM	
Athlete	Event	Opposition Result	Opposition Result	Opposition Result	Opposition Result	Opposition Result	Opposition Result	Rank
Vikas B.K.	Men's –60 kg	–	–	–	–	–	–	
Vishesh B.K.	Men's –66 kg	–	–	–	–	–	–	
Sujan Gurung	Men's –90 kg	–	–	–	–	–	–	
Nisha Shrestha	Women's –48 kg	–	–	–	–	–	–	
Debaki Maya Shrestha	Women's –52 kg	–	–	–	–	–	–	
Punam Shrestha	Women's –70 kg	–	–	–	–	–	–	

== Kabaddi ==
Team	Event	Group stage					Semi-final	Final	
Team	Event	Opposition Score	Opposition Score	Opposition Score	Opposition Score	Rank	Opposition Score	Opposition Score	Rank
Men's team	Men's	Thailand; L 48–59	Pakistan; L 43–58	Iran; L 23–76	Malaysia; W 73–52	4	—N/a		8
Women's team	Women's	Thailand; W 46–43	Chinese Taipei; L 18–37	Sri Lanka; W 34–25	—N/a	2 Q	India; L 24–48	—N/a	3rd place, bronze medalist(s)

Men's tournament

Squad

Head coach: (Nepal) Bishnu Datt Bhatt

- Ghanshyam Roka Magar (c)
- Anku Pun
- Aaditya Chaudhary
- Prakash Giri
- Suraj Bohara
- Sanskar Kumar
- Rabi Tharu
- Ashok Joshi
- Sagar Yadav
- Kumar Lama
- Ganesh Parki
- Karun Rasaili

Women's tournament

Squad

Head coach: (Nepal) Parbati Rai

- Manmati Bist (c)
- Rabina Chaudhary
- Jayanti Badu
- Ganga Ghimire
- Khim Maya Khatri
- Manisha Joshi
- Mina Nepali
- Binita Pandit Chhetri
- Nanu Maya Parajuli
- Menuka Kumari Rajbanshi
- Sirjana Kumari Tharu
- Asma Yadav

== Karate ==
Men

Athlete	Event	Round of 16	Quarterfinals	Semifinals	Repechage	Final / BM	
Athlete	Event	Opposition Result	Opposition Result	Opposition Result	Opposition Result	Opposition Result	Rank
Rakesh Manandhar	–55 kg	—N/a	Ingloy (THA); W 9–0	Khalimov (UZB); L 0–7	—N/a	Kaliana Sundram (MAS); L 1–9	5
Min Bahadur Tamang	–60 kg	Chau KH (HKG); W 4–1	Mirzozoda (TJK); W 2–0	Shaaban (KUW); L 0–10	—N/a	Basher (KSA); L 0–2	5
Tenzing Sherpa	+84 kg	—N/a	Leong OT (MAC); W 0^{H}–1	Nemati (IRI); L 0–5	—N/a	Xayasan (LAO); W 9–1	3rd place, bronze medalist(s)

Women

Athlete	Event	Round of 16	Quarterfinals	Semifinals	Repechage	Final / BM	
Athlete	Event	Opposition Result	Opposition Result	Opposition Result	Opposition Result	Opposition Result	Rank
Sanu Maya Thing	Individual kata	Choi H-e (KOR); L 0–5	Did not advance				
Alisa Raskoti Magar; Megha Limbu; Sanu Maya Thing	Team kata	—N/a	Vietnam; L 0–5	Did not advance	—N/a	Chinese Taipei; L 0–5	5
Nirupa Dong Tamang	–68 kg	—N/a	Wong CL (HKG); L 0–3	Did not advance			

== Soft tennis ==
Men

Athlete	Event	Group stage			Second Stage	Quarter-finals	Semi-finals	Final / BM	
Athlete	Event	Opposition Score	Opposition Score	Rank	Opposition Score	Opposition Score	Opposition Score	Opposition Score	Rank
Kamal Bhandari	Singles	Chang (TPE); L 0–4	Louangsisombath (LAO); W 4–3	2	Did not advance				
Pradip Khatri	Singles	Arcilla (PHI); L 0–4	Lee (KOR); L 0–4	3	Did not advance				
Brijesh Pandey; Kamal Bhandari; Pradip Khatri	Team	South Korea; L 0–3	Indonesia; L 0–3	3	—N/a		Did not advance		

Women

Athlete	Event	Group stage			Second Stage	Quarter-finals	Semi-finals	Final / BM	
Athlete	Event	Opposition Score	Opposition Score	Rank	Opposition Score	Opposition Score	Opposition Score	Opposition Score	Rank
Georgia Chaudhary	Singles	Temma (JPN); L 0–4	Erdenbileg (MGL); L 0–4	3	Did not advance				

Mixed

Athlete	Event	Group stage			Second Stage	Quarter-finals	Semi-finals	Final / BM	
Athlete	Event	Opposition Score	Opposition Score	Rank	Opposition Score	Opposition Score	Opposition Score	Opposition Score	Rank
Georgia Chaudhary; Kamal Bhandari	Doubles	Yu / Huang (TPE); L 0–5	Khurelbayar / Ganbold (MGL); W 5–4	2 q	Sanger / Arasy (INA); L 1–5	Did not advance			

== Table tennis ==
Men

Athlete	Event	Round of 64	Round of 32	Round of 16	Quarterfinal	Semifinal	Final / BM	
Athlete	Event	Opposition Result	Opposition Result	Opposition Result	Opposition Result	Opposition Result	Opposition Result	Rank
Rubin Maharjan	Singles	Mak (MAC); L 1–4	Did not advance					
Sanyog Kapali	Singles	Gubran (YEM); L 1–4	Did not advance					
Rubin Maharjan; Sanyog Kapali	Doubles	Bye	Togami / Matsushima (THA); L 0–3	Did not advance				

Women

Athlete	Event	Round of 64	Round of 32	Round of 16	Quarterfinal	Semifinal	Final / BM	
Athlete	Event	Opposition Result	Opposition Result	Opposition Result	Opposition Result	Opposition Result	Opposition Result	Rank
Evana Thapa	Singles	Kamalova (QAT); L 0–4	Did not advance					
Nabita Shrestha	Singles	Chen S-y (TPE); L 1–4	Did not advance					
Evana Thapa; Nabita Shrestha	Doubles	Bye	Lai / Tan (SGP); L w/o	Did not advance				

Mixed

Athlete	Event	Round of 64	Round of 32	Round of 16	Quarterfinal	Semifinal	Final / BM	
Athlete	Event	Opposition Result	Opposition Result	Opposition Result	Opposition Result	Opposition Result	Opposition Result	Rank
Evana Thapa; Rubin Maharjan	Doubles	M. Khan / K. Khan (PAK); W 3–0	Yiu KT / Ng WL (THA); L 0–3	Did not advance				
Nabita Shrestha; Sanyog Kapali	Doubles	Ankhbayar / Ser-Od (MGL); L 1–3	Did not advance					

Team

Athlete	Event	Group stage			Round of 16	Quarterfinal	Semifinal	Final	
Athlete	Event	Opposition Score	Opposition Score	Rank	Opposition Score	Opposition Score	Opposition Score	Opposition Score	Rank
Gananjaya Dahal; Rubin Maharjan; Sanyog Kapali	Men's	Chinese Taipei; L 0–3	Bahrain; L 0–3	3	Did not advance				
Evana Thapa; Nabita Shrestha; Yonggi Poudel	Women's	China; L 0–3	Macau; L 1–3	3	Did not advance				

== Volleyball ==
Summary

Team	Group stage			Quarterfinal	Semi-final	Final / BM	
Team	Opposition Result	Opposition Result	Rank	Opposition Result	Opposition Result	Opposition Result	Rank
Women's team	Japan; L 0–3	Indonesia; L 0–3	3 C	Kyrgyzstan; W 3–0	Hong Kong; L 0–3	Mongolia; L 0–3	12

=== Women's tournament ===
Head coach

- (Nepal) Jagdish Prasad Bhatta

Squad

- Niruta Thagunna
- Salina Shrestha
- Usha Bhandari
- Sumitra Regmi
- Pragati Nath
- Mina Sunar
- Salina Buddha Magar
- Laxmi Chand
- Sunita Khatri
- Roma Kunwar
- Aarati Subedi
- Basanti Saud

Pool A

Pos	Team	Pld	W	L	Pts	SW	SL	SR	SPW	SPL	SPR	Qualification
1	Japan (H)	2	2	0	6	6	1	6.000	173	111	1.559	Quarterfinals
2	Indonesia	2	1	1	3	4	3	1.333	155	151	1.026	Quarterfinals
3	Nepal	2	0	2	0	0	6	0.000	84	150	0.560	Classification 9th–14th

Source: asiangames2026.org
Rules for classification: Tiebreakers
(H) Host

== Wushu ==
=== Taolu ===
Men

Athlete	Event	Event 1		Event 2		Total	Rank
Athlete	Event	Result	Rank	Result	Rank	Total	Rank
Bijay Sinjali	Changquan	9.146	19	—N/a		9.146	196
Rajib Tamang	Daoshu & gunshu						
Deepak Hamal	Nanquan & nangun						
Hari Prasad Gole	Taijiquan & taijijian	9.630	12	9.506	14	19.136	12

Women

Athlete	Event	Event 1		Event 2		Total	Rank
Athlete	Event	Result	Rank	Result	Rank	Total	Rank
Susmita Tamang	Changquan	9.580	13	—N/a		9.580	13
Sarita Rai	Taijiquan & taijijian	8.653	11	9.183	10	17.836	11

=== Sanda ===
Men

Athlete	Event	Round of 16	Quarter-finals	Semi-finals	Final	
Athlete	Event	Opposition Score	Opposition Score	Opposition Score	Opposition Score	Rank
Rohit Chunara	–56 kg	Ou JM (CHN); L WPD	Did not advance			
Amar Sunar	–65 kg	–	–	–	–	
Sanjeev Maharjan	–75 kg	Bye	–	–	–	

Women

Athlete	Event	Round of 16	Quarter-finals	Semi-finals	Final	
Athlete	Event	Opposition Score	Opposition Score	Opposition Score	Opposition Score	Rank
Rita Thakulla	–60 kg	Jorayeva (TKM); L 0–2	Did not advance			
