= Kabaddi at the 2022 Asian Games =

Asian Games event

- Venue: Xiaoshan Guali Sports Centre
- Dates: 2–7 October 2023
- Competitors: 187 from 10 nations

Kabaddi was incorporated into the Asian Games in 1990. Kabaddi at the 2022 Asian Games was held at Guali Cultural & Sports Centre, Xiaoshan District, China, from 2 to 7 October 2023.

== Schedule ==
P	Preliminary round	½	Semifinals	F	Final

Event↓/Date →	2nd Mon	3rd Tue	4th Wed	5th Thu	6th Fri	7th Sat
Men	P	P	P	P	½	F
Women	P	P	P	P	½	F

== Medalists ==
Event	Gold	Silver	Bronze
Men	India; Nitesh Kumar; Aslam Inamdar; Nitin Rawal; Parvesh Bhainswal; Surjeet Singh Narwal; Vishal Bhardwaj; Naveen Kumar; Sunil Kumar; Pawan Sehrawat; Arjun Deshwal; Akash Shinde; Sachin Tanwar	Iran; Fazel Atrachali; Mohammad Esmaeil Nabibakhsh; Milad Jabbari; Hamid Mirzaei; Reza Mirbagheri; Amir Hossein Bastami; Alireza Mirzaeian; Mohammad Reza Shadloo; Moein Shafaghi; Mohammad Kazem Nasseri; Mohammad Reza Kaboudarahangi; Amir Mohammad Zafardanesh	Pakistan; Mudassar Ali; Tahseen Ullah; Sajjad Shaukat; Akhlaq Ahmed; Muzammil Zafar; Umair Khan; Usman Ahmed; Muhammad Imran; Waqar Ali; Mazhar Iqbal; Muhammad Safian
Men	India; Nitesh Kumar; Aslam Inamdar; Nitin Rawal; Parvesh Bhainswal; Surjeet Singh Narwal; Vishal Bhardwaj; Naveen Kumar; Sunil Kumar; Pawan Sehrawat; Arjun Deshwal; Akash Shinde; Sachin Tanwar	Iran; Fazel Atrachali; Mohammad Esmaeil Nabibakhsh; Milad Jabbari; Hamid Mirzaei; Reza Mirbagheri; Amir Hossein Bastami; Alireza Mirzaeian; Mohammad Reza Shadloo; Moein Shafaghi; Mohammad Kazem Nasseri; Mohammad Reza Kaboudarahangi; Amir Mohammad Zafardanesh	Chinese Taipei; Huang Tzu-ming; Li Hao-wei; Lin I-ching; Chang Chia-ming; Li Jyun-jie; Yu Hao-cheng; Wu Wei-jheng; Wang Lunchu; Huang Jih-hung; Chang Chung-mao; Chen Zheng-wei; Tsai Chung-hao
Women	India; Sushma Sharma; Sakshi Kumari; Pushpa Rana; Nidhi Sharma; Muskan Malik; Priyanka Pilaniya; Ritu Negi; Pooja Hathwala; Pooja Narwal; Jyoti Thakur; Akshima Singh; Snehal Shinde	Chinese Taipei; Lin I-min; Chuang Ya-hun; Hu Yu-chen; Huang Ssu-chin; Yen Chiao-wen; Ren Ming-xiu; Kang Yung-chiao; Feng Hsiu-chen; Qin Pei-jyun; Huang Yi-yun; Liu Yi-ju; Wu Yu-jung	Nepal; Manmati Bist; Nitu Gurung; Menuka Kumari Rajbanshi; Jayanti Badu; Isha Rai; Arpana Chaudhary; Srijana Kumari Tharu; Sunita Thapa; Rabina Chaudhary; Kalawati Pant; Anuja Kulung Rai; Ganga Ghimire
Women	India; Sushma Sharma; Sakshi Kumari; Pushpa Rana; Nidhi Sharma; Muskan Malik; Priyanka Pilaniya; Ritu Negi; Pooja Hathwala; Pooja Narwal; Jyoti Thakur; Akshima Singh; Snehal Shinde	Chinese Taipei; Lin I-min; Chuang Ya-hun; Hu Yu-chen; Huang Ssu-chin; Yen Chiao-wen; Ren Ming-xiu; Kang Yung-chiao; Feng Hsiu-chen; Qin Pei-jyun; Huang Yi-yun; Liu Yi-ju; Wu Yu-jung	Iran; Ghazal Khalaj; Mahboubeh Sanchouli; Zahra Karimi; Saeideh Jafari; Sedigheh Jafari; Roya Davoudian; Farideh Zarifdoust; Mohaddeseh Rajabloo; Fatemeh Khodabandehloo; Fatemeh Mansouri; Maryam Solgi; Raheleh Naderi

== Medal table ==
Rank	Nation	Gold	Silver	Bronze	Total
1	India (IND)	2	0	0	2
2	Chinese Taipei (TPE)	0	1	1	2
2	Iran (IRI)	0	1	1	2
4	Nepal (NEP)	0	0	1	1
4	Pakistan (PAK)	0	0	1	1
Totals (5 entries)		2	2	4	8

== Draw ==
A draw ceremony was held on 28 September 2023 in Hangzhou to determine the groups for the men's and women's competitions.

=== Men ===
Group A

- India
- Bangladesh
- Chinese Taipei
- Thailand
- Japan

Group B

- Iran
- South Korea
- Pakistan
- Malaysia

=== Women ===
Group A

- India
- Chinese Taipei
- Thailand
- South Korea

Group B

- Iran
- Bangladesh
- Nepal

== Final standing ==
=== Men ===
Rank	Team	Pld	W	D	L
1st place, gold medalist(s)	India	6	6	0	0
2nd place, silver medalist(s)	Iran	5	4	0	1
3rd place, bronze medalist(s)	Chinese Taipei	5	3	0	2
3rd place, bronze medalist(s)	Pakistan	4	2	0	2
5	Bangladesh	4	2	0	2
5	Malaysia	3	1	0	2
7	South Korea	3	0	0	3
7	Thailand	4	1	0	3
9	Japan	4	0	0	4

=== Women ===
Rank	Team	Pld	W	D	L
1st place, gold medalist(s)	India	5	4	1	0
2nd place, silver medalist(s)	Chinese Taipei	5	3	1	1
3rd place, bronze medalist(s)	Iran	3	2	0	1
3rd place, bronze medalist(s)	Nepal	3	1	0	2
5	Bangladesh	2	0	0	2
5	Thailand	3	1	0	2
7	South Korea	3	0	0	3
