= Kabaddi at the 2026 Asian Games =

- Venues: Tōkai Citizens Gymnasium
- Dates: 21–26 September 2026
- Nations: 11

Kabaddi at the 2026 Asian Games is being held between 21 and 26 September 2026 at Tōkai Citizens Gymnasium. This is the sport's consecutive ninth appearance at the Games, since the 1990 edition. India are the defending champions in both events.

== Schedule ==
The schedule is as follows:

P	Preliminary round	½	Semifinals	F	Final

Event↓/Date →	21st Mon	22nd Tue	23rd Wed	24th Thu	25th Fri	26th Sat
Men's tournament	P	P	P	P	½	F
Women's tournament	P	P	P	P	½	F

== Participating nations ==
A draw ceremony was held on 23 July 2026 at Nagoya to determine the groups for the men's and women's competitions.

Nation	Men's	Women's
Bangladesh	Yes	Yes
Chinese Taipei	Yes	Yes
Iran	Yes	Yes
India	Yes	Yes
Japan	Yes	Yes
Malaysia	Yes	—N/a
Nepal	Yes	Yes
Pakistan	Yes	—N/a
South Korea	Yes	—N/a
Sri Lanka	—N/a	Yes
Thailand	Yes	Yes
Total: 11 NOCs	10/10	8/8

== Medal summary ==
=== Medal table ===
Rank	Nation	Gold	Silver	Bronze	Total
1	India	2	0	0	2
2	Iran	0	2	0	2
3	Chinese Taipei	0	0	2	2
4	Nepal	0	0	1	1
4	Thailand	0	0	1	1
Totals (5 entries)		2	2	4	8

=== Medalists ===
Event	Gold	Silver	Bronze
Men	India; Rahul Sethpal; Gaurav Khatri; Pawan Sehrawat; Ashu Malik; Arjun Deshwal; Sumit Sangwan; Jaideep Dahiya; Ayan Lohchab; Ankit Jaglan; Sunil Kumar; Devank Dalal; Aslam Inamdar	Iran; Fazel Atrachali; Mohammad Reza Shadloui; Amir Hossein Ejlali; Omid Khojasteh; Ali Samadi; Amir Hossein Bastami; Alireza Mirzaeian; Mohammad Esmaeil Nabibakhsh; Reza Mirbagheri; Amirmohammad Zafar Danesh; Amirreza Aliakbari; Amirhossein Taghipour	Thailand; Chayaphon Kamunee; Rattanakon Yotsungnoen; Supawit Somrat; Saharat Phetchui; Khomkrit Jittiang; Nopphadon Pontaisong; Nithiphat Phikhrao; Somboon Kaewkampon; Tanongsak Srihera; Pramot Saising; Theeradet Chaisit; Wisat Wuttari
Men	India; Rahul Sethpal; Gaurav Khatri; Pawan Sehrawat; Ashu Malik; Arjun Deshwal; Sumit Sangwan; Jaideep Dahiya; Ayan Lohchab; Ankit Jaglan; Sunil Kumar; Devank Dalal; Aslam Inamdar	Iran; Fazel Atrachali; Mohammad Reza Shadloui; Amir Hossein Ejlali; Omid Khojasteh; Ali Samadi; Amir Hossein Bastami; Alireza Mirzaeian; Mohammad Esmaeil Nabibakhsh; Reza Mirbagheri; Amirmohammad Zafar Danesh; Amirreza Aliakbari; Amirhossein Taghipour	Chinese Taipei; Chen Zheng-wei; Chuang Chia-ming; Li Jyun-jie; Lin Po-ting; Cai Ruei-chen; Su Hsiang-chih; Chang Chung-mao; Jin Wu Fu-kai; Wang Lun-chu; Peng Xian-ya; Tsai Chung-hao; Yeh Jiunn-ming
Women	India; Pooja Hathwala; Raj Rani; Sonali Shingate; Pushpa Rana; Bhavna Thakur; Ritu Sheoran; Sanju Devi; Ritu Negi; Manisha Kumari; Pinki Roy; Jyoti Thakur; Nikita Kumari	Iran; Mahtab Lak; Zahra Astereki; Saniya Naeimi Marani; Hadiseh Varasteh; Nikta Jalalvand; Zahra Khodabandehloo; Zakiyeh Malmali; Aynaz Faramarzi; Atena Madadi; Zahra Karimi; Fereshte Kolagar; Sahar Yari	Nepal; Rabina Chaudhary; Srijana Kumari Tharu; Ganga Ghimire; Manmati Bist; Jayanti Badu; Khim Maya Khatri; Menuka Kumari Rajbanshi; Mina Nepali; Asma Yadav; Nanu Maya Parajuli; Binita Pandit Chhetri; Manisha Joshi
Women	India; Pooja Hathwala; Raj Rani; Sonali Shingate; Pushpa Rana; Bhavna Thakur; Ritu Sheoran; Sanju Devi; Ritu Negi; Manisha Kumari; Pinki Roy; Jyoti Thakur; Nikita Kumari	Iran; Mahtab Lak; Zahra Astereki; Saniya Naeimi Marani; Hadiseh Varasteh; Nikta Jalalvand; Zahra Khodabandehloo; Zakiyeh Malmali; Aynaz Faramarzi; Atena Madadi; Zahra Karimi; Fereshte Kolagar; Sahar Yari	Chinese Taipei; Hu Yu-chen; Huang Ssu-chin; Chuang Ya-han; Huang Yi-yun; Chen Shi-han; Ren Ming-xiu; Lin I-min; Yen Chiao-wen; Feng Hsiu-chen; Qin Pei-jyun; Wu Yu-jung; Kang Yung-chiao
