= Anuja Kulung Rai =

Nepali kabaddi player

Personal information
- Nationality: Nepali
- Born: 29 October 1998 (age 28)
- Occupation: Kabaddi player

Sport
- Sport: Kabaddi
- Club: Nepal Army
Medal record
Women's Kabaddi
Representing Nepal
Asian Games
Bronze medal – third place	2022 Hangzhou	Team competition
Asian Beach Games
Bronze medal – third place	2026 Sanya	Team competition

Anuja Kulung Rai (born 29 October 1998) is a Nepali kabaddi player. She has represented Nepal at the 2022 Asian Games and the 2026 Asian Beach Games, winning bronze medals in women's kabaddi at both competitions. She has also represented the Nepal Army and has served as vice-captain of the Nepal women's national kabaddi team.

== Early life and career ==
Rai grew up in Jhapa District in eastern Nepal. She developed an interest in kabaddi and trained despite opposition from her family. she travelled by bicycle for more than an hour and sometimes travelled secretly to nearby cities to train.

Rai later joined the Nepal Army and became a member of the Nepal women's national kabaddi team. She was selected for Nepal's squad for the 2022 Asian Games, alongside fellow Nepal Army players Ganga Ghimire and Isha Rai.

== International career ==
=== 2022 Asian Games ===
Rai was selected as one of 12 members of Nepal's women's kabaddi team for the 2022 Asian Games in Hangzhou, China. Before the Games, she took part in a 30-day training programme and seven practice matches in Haryana, India, as part of Nepal's preparations for the tournament.

Nepal reached the semifinals of the women's kabaddi tournament, where it lost to India. The result secured Nepal the bronze medal, its first medal in women's kabaddi at the Asian Games. Rai was a member of the bronze medal-winning team.

=== 2026 Asian Beach Games ===
Rai represented Nepal in women's beach kabaddi at the 2026 Asian Beach Games in Sanya, China. Nepal finished third in the women's tournament and won the bronze medal. Rai was part of the Nepal team and competed in the preliminary round, including Nepal's match against Chinese Taipei on 23 April 2026.

== Awards and honours ==
In 2023, Rai was listed among the nominees for the Nepal Olympic Committee Award for Best Female Athlete.
