= Kabaddi at the 2026 Asian Games – Women's tournament =

Women's Kabaddi at the 2026 Asian Games
- Venue: Tōkai Citizens Gymnasium
- Date: 21–26 September 2026
- Nations: 8

Medalists
gold medal	India
silver medal	Iran
bronze medal	Nepal
bronze medal	Chinese Taipei

Women's Kabaddi at the 2026 Asian Games was held at Tōkai Citizens Gymnasium, Tōkai, Japan in 21–26 September 2026.

== Squads ==
India	Iran	Bangladesh	Japan
Jyoti; Manisha Kumari; Pushpa; Nikita; Sonali Vishnu Shingate; Ritu Negi; Raj Rani; Pooja; Ritu; Bhavna Devi; Pinki Roy; Sanju Devi	Zahra Astereki; Atena Madadi; Zahra Karimi; Saniya Naeimi Marani; Aynaz Faramarzi Zobaran; Nikta Jalavand; Hadiseh Varastehkalmarzi; Zahra Khodabandehloo; Sahar Yarisararoudi; Mahtab Lakaliabadi; Fereshte Kolagar; Zakiyeh Malmali	Sraboni Mollick; Brishti Biswas; Rekha Aktery; Meybi Chakma; Anzuara Ratry; Loba Akter; Rupali Akter; Mst Israt Jahan Sadika; Sucharita Chakma; Khadiza Khatun; Mst Yasmin Khanom; Mst Nahida Akter	Yoko Ota; Miki Terao; Yawara Kito; Yuri Kuroyanagi; Mari Akatsu; Shiho Hikichi; Risa Onda; Misato Ishio; Miho Suganuma; Tomomi Masuko; Futaba Oya; Natsumi Ichijo
Chinese Taipei	Nepal	Thailand	Sri Lanka
Lin I-min; Chuang Ya-han; Hu Yu-chen; Huang Ssu-chin; Yen Chiao-wen; Ren Ming-xiu; Kang Yung-chiao; Feng Hsiu-chen; Qin Pei-jyun; Huang Yi-yun; Chen Shi-han; Wu Yu-jung	Nanu Maya Parajuli; Manisha Joshi; Menuka Kumari Rajbanshi; Jayanti Badu; Binita Pandit Chhetri; Asma Yadav; Manmati Bist; Mina Nepali; Rabina Chaudhary; Srijana Kumari Tharu; Khim Maya Khatri; Ganga Ghimire	Natthidaphorn Kaewmai; Wassana Rachmanee; Diana Deesalarm; Sirada Chanchaemsri; Bencharat Khwanchai; Kamontip Tippichaikul; Wanatsanan Tipkonglas; Pawarisa Eaddam; Saengdao Ramsin; Thanyalak Benrit; Papaporn Jaiyod; Phanida Autthapong	Navodya Sherangi Allagoda Manage; Madushani Premarathnage; Hansika Kumuduni Bandara Dibula Gedara; Anushika Sewmini Gunarath Kuruppu Arachchilage; Madurika Hansamali Alahakoon Pathiranalage; Priyavarna Rasathurai; Shanika Sudarshani Bandar Henaka Ralalage; Kajenthini Rasa; Diluxshana Vimalenthiran; Nadeeka Gunasekara Samasundara Mudiyanselage; Upeksha Harshani Jayaweer Sooriyapperuma Arachchige; Hirushi Kavindya Godamunn Uhanegedara

== Group stage ==
Group A
Pos	Team	Pld	W	D	L	PF	PA	PD	Pts	Qualification	IND	IRI	BAN	JPN
1	India	3	3	0	0	129	69	+60	6	Semifinals	—	37–23	42–21	50–25
2	Iran	3	2	0	1	140	76	+64	4	Semifinals		—	54–19	63–20
3	Bangladesh	3	1	0	2	82	118	−36	2				—	42–22
4	Japan (H)	3	0	0	3	67	155	−88	0					—

Source: Asian Games 2026
Legend: Blue = home team win; Yellow = draw; Red = away team win.
(H) Hosts

21 September
12:00

Iran	63–20 (HT: 32–5)	Japan

Tokai Citizen Gymnasium, Tokai

21 September
19:45

Bangladesh	21–42 (HT: 10–21)	India

Tokai Citizen Gymnasium, Tokai

22 September
17:15

Iran	54–19 (HT: 25–9)	Bangladesh

Tokai Citizen Gymnasium, Tokai

23 September
12:00

Iran	23–37 (HT: 15–19)	India

Tokai Citizen Gymnasium, Tokai

23 September
17:15

Japan	22–42 (HT: 11–18)	Bangladesh

Tokai Citizen Gymnasium, Tokai

24 September
19:45

Japan	25–50 (HT: 13–32)	India

Tokai Citizen Gymnasium, Tokai

Group B
Pos	Team	Pld	W	D	L	PF	PA	PD	Pts	Qualification	TPE	NEP	THA	SRI
1	Chinese Taipei	3	3	0	0	143	66	+77	6	Semifinals	—	37–18	43–31	63–17
2	Nepal	3	2	0	1	98	105	−7	4	Semifinals		—	46–43	34–25
3	Thailand	3	1	0	2	114	117	−3	2				—	40–25
4	Sri Lanka	3	0	0	3	70	137	−67	0					—

Source: Asian Games 2026
Legend: Blue = home team win; Yellow = draw; Red = away team win.

21 September
17:15

Sri Lanka	28–40 (HT: 10–24)	Thailand

Tokai Citizen Gymnasium, Tokai

22 September
12:00

Thailand	43–46 (HT: 24–15)	Nepal

Tokai Citizen Gymnasium, Tokai

22 September
19:45

Sri Lanka	17–63 (HT: 9–31)	Chinese Taipei

Tokai Citizen Gymnasium, Tokai

23 September
19:45

Chinese Taipei	37–18 (HT: 13–13)	Nepal

Tokai Citizen Gymnasium, Tokai

24 September
12:00

Thailand	31–43 (HT: 19–23)	Chinese Taipei

Tokai Citizen Gymnasium, Tokai

24 September
17:15

Sri Lanka	25–34 (HT: 13–19)	Nepal

Tokai Citizen Gymnasium, Tokai

=== Knockout round ===
Semifinals
25 September
India	48
Nepal	24
25 September
Iran	23
Chinese Taipei	19

Gold medal match
26 September
India	37
Iran	34

==== Semifinals ====
25 September
13:00

India	48–24 (HT: 31–17)	Nepal

Tokai Citizen Gymnasium, Tokai

25 September
18:00

Iran	23–19 (HT: 14–9)	Chinese Taipei

Tokai Citizen Gymnasium, Tokai

==== Gold medal match ====
26 September
13:00

India	37–34 (HT: 22–16)	Iran

Tokai Citizen Gymnasium, Tokai

== Final standing ==
Rank	Team	Pld	W	D	L
1st place, gold medalist(s)	India	5	5	0	0
2nd place, silver medalist(s)	Iran	5	3	0	2
3rd place, bronze medalist(s)	Nepal	4	2	0	2
3rd place, bronze medalist(s)	Chinese Taipei	4	3	0	1
5	Bangladesh	3	1	0	2
5	Thailand	3	1	0	2
7	Japan	3	0	0	3
7	Sri Lanka	3	0	0	3

== See also ==
- Kabaddi at the 2026 Asian Games – Men's tournament
