= Nitu Gurung =

Nepali kabaddi player

Personal information
- Nationality: Nepali
- Born: 24 May 1988
- Occupation: Kabaddi player

Sport
- Sport: Kabaddi
- Club: Nepal Police Club
Medal record
Women's kabaddi
Representing Nepal
South Asian Games
Bronze medal – third place	2010 Dhaka	Women's team
Bronze medal – third place	2016 Guwahati–Shillong	Women's team
Asian Games
Bronze medal – third place	2022 Hangzhou	Team competition

Nitu Gurung (born 24 May 1988) is a Nepali kabaddi player. She has represented Nepal at the South Asian Games and Asian Games, winning bronze medals at the 2010 South Asian Games, 2016 South Asian Games and 2022 Asian Games. She has been associated with the Nepal Police Club.

== Kabaddi career ==
Gurung was selected for Nepal's women's kabaddi team for the 2010 South Asian Games in Dhaka, Bangladesh. She was one of the players from the Nepal Police Club selected for the tournament. Nepal won the bronze medal in the women's kabaddi competition.

Gurung was again selected for Nepal's women's kabaddi team for the 2016 South Asian Games in Guwahati and Shillong, India. Nepal won another bronze medal in the women's kabaddi competition.

In 2023, Gurung was selected as a member of Nepal's women's kabaddi team for the 2022 Asian Games in Hangzhou, China. She took part in a 30-day special training programme and seven practice matches in Haryana, India, as part of Nepal's preparations for the Games.

At the Asian Games, Gurung was part of Nepal's women's team that reached the semifinals. Nepal lost to India in the semifinal and received the bronze medal. It was Nepal's first women's kabaddi medal at the Asian Games.
