= Sunita Thapa =

Nepali kabaddi player

Personal information
- Nationality: Nepali
- Born: 1 March 2001 (age 25)
- Occupation: Kabaddi player

Sport
- Sport: Kabaddi
- Club: Armed Police Force Club
Medal record
Women's kabaddi
Representing Nepal
Asian Games
| Bronze medal – third place | 2022 Hangzhou | Team competition |

Sunita Thapa (born 1 March 2001) is a Nepali kabaddi player. She represented Nepal at the 2022 Asian Games in Hangzhou, China, where the Nepal women's kabaddi team won the bronze medal.

== Kabaddi career ==
Thapa was selected for Nepal's women's kabaddi team for the 2022 Asian Games. She was among the 12 players selected for the team and took part in Nepal's preparations for the tournament.

Before the Games, Thapa participated in a 30-day special training programme and seven practice matches at Gurukul Academy in Haryana, India, as part of Nepal's preparations for the Asian Games.

At the 2022 Asian Games, Nepal reached the semifinals of the women's kabaddi tournament and won the bronze medal. Thapa was a member of the bronze medal-winning Nepal team.
