= World Kabaddi (disambiguation) =

World Kabaddi is an organisation that governs the sport of kabaddi.

World Kabaddi may also refer to:

- World Kabaddi Federation (founded 2003, incorporated 2005, according to its website), an organisation established for the sport of kabaddi
- World Kabaddi League, a short-lived international league

== See also ==
- International Kabaddi Federation
- Kabaddi World Cup (disambiguation)
