= Kabaddi at the South Asian Games =

- Sport: Kabaddi
- Founded: 1984; 42 years ago
- First season: 1984
- Administrator: SAOC
- No. of teams: 7
- Region: South Asia
- Most recent champions: M: India (10th title); W: India (4th title)
- Most titles: M: India (10 titles); W: India (4 titles)

Kabaddi was introduced at the South Asian Games during the 1985 Games. There were no Kabaddi tournaments in the inaugural 1984 edition. India is the most successful team.

== Results ==
=== Men's ===
Year	Gold	Silver	Bronze
1984; Details	No kabaddi tournament		
1985; Details	India	Bangladesh	Pakistan
1987; Details	India	Bangladesh	Pakistan
1989; Details	India	Pakistan	Bangladesh
1991; Details	No kabaddi tournament		
1993; Details	Pakistan	India	Bangladesh
1995; Details	India	Bangladesh	Pakistan
1999; Details	India	Pakistan	Sri Lanka
2004; Details	India	Pakistan	Bangladesh
2006; Details	India	Pakistan	Bangladesh
2010; Details	India	Pakistan	Bangladesh; Nepal
2016; Details	India	Pakistan	Bangladesh; Sri Lanka
2019; Details	India	Sri Lanka	Pakistan; Bangladesh

=== Women's ===
Year	Gold	Silver	Bronze
2006; Details	India	Sri Lanka	Bangladesh
2010; Details	India	Bangladesh	Nepal Sri Lanka
2016; Details	India	Bangladesh	Nepal Sri Lanka
2019; Details	India	Nepal	Bangladesh Sri Lanka
