= 2016 Kabaddi World Cup (circle style) =

International kabaddi tournament in India

Tournament information
- Dates: 4 November–17 November
- Administrator: Government of Punjab
- Format: Circle style
- Tournament format(s): Round-robin and Knockout
- Host: India
- Venue: 13
- Participants: 12

Final positions
- Champions: M: India (6th title); W: India (3rd title)
- 1st runners-up: M: England; W: United States
- 2nd runners-up: M: United States; W: Kenya

Tournament statistics
- Best Raider: (India) Sandeep Surakhpuria; Sultan Singh
- Best Stopper: (India) Khushdeep Duggan

The 2016 World Kabaddi Cup was the sixth edition of the circle style World Kabaddi Cup, held from 4 November to 17 November 2016 with the Opening Ceremony on 3 November 2016 at the Nehru stadium Roopnagar. The tournament took place in Punjab, India.

== Organization ==
The tournament was organized by the Government of Punjab, India.

== Participating nations ==
The 13 day event had 12 participating nations in the men's tournament, with 8 participating nations in the women's tournament.

=== Men's tournament ===
- Argentina
- Australia
- Canada
- England
- India
- Iran
- Kenya
- Sierra Leone
- Sri Lanka
- Sweden
- Tanzania
- United States

=== Women's tournament ===
- India
- Kenya
- Mexico
- New Zealand
- Sierra Leone
- Sri Lanka
- Tanzania
- United States

== Venues ==
The games were played at the following venues.

- Government College Stadium, Gurdaspur
- Shaheed Kartar Singh Sarabha Sports Stadium, Sarabha, Ludhiana
- Sports Stadium, Attari, Amritsar
- Kabaddi Stadium, Moonak, Sangrur
- Kabaddi Ground, Begowal, Kapurthala
- Sports Stadium, Rode, Moga
- Sports Stadium, Adampur, Jalandhar
- Baba Kala Mehar Stadium, Barnala
- Guru Arjun Dev Sports Stadium, Chohla Sahib, Tarn Taran
- Govt. Ripudaman College Stadium, Nabha, Patiala
- Yadwindra Stadium, Mehraj, Bathinda
- Guru Gobind Singh Multipurpose Stadium, Badal, Bathinda
- Multipurpose Sports Stadium, Jalalabad, Fazilka

== Opening and closing ceremonies ==
The opening ceremony was held on 3 November in the Evening at Nehru Stadium in Roopnagar. Gippy Grewal, Sharry Mann, Jaspinder Narula, Bharti Singh, Arjan Bajwa and Noora Sisters appeared at this event.

The closing ceremony was held on 17 November, before the final match at Multipurpose Sports Stadium, Jalalabad, Fazilka.

== Controversy ==
In the first semi final on 15 Nov, several controversial decisions given in favor of England triggered some protest during the match by Iranian players. Eventually it was decided that match would go into extra time, in which England narrowly escaped with a 41–39 win. Iranian players were seen unhappy with the conclusion.

== Schedule (Men’s) ==
Note: All matches' timings are according to Indian Standard Time (UTC +5:30)

=== Group stage ===
==== Pool A ====
Team	Pld	W	D	L	SF	SA	SD	Pts
India	5	5	0	0	263	190	73	10
England	5	4	0	1	245	165	80	8
Canada	5	3	0	2	237	182	55	6
Sierra Leone	5	2	0	3	216	183	33	4
Sweden	5	1	0	4	181	240	-59	2
Sri Lanka	5	0	0	5	114	296	-182	0

Qualified for semifinals

5 November 2016
12:25

England	57-23	Sweden

Shaheed Kartar Singh Sarabha Sports Stadium, Sarabha, Ludhiana

5 November 2016
13:30

India	46-38	Sierra Leone

Shaheed Kartar Singh Sarabha Sports Stadium, Sarabha, Ludhiana

5 November 2016
14:30

Sri Lanka	29-60	Canada

Shaheed Kartar Singh Sarabha Sports Stadium, Sarabha, Ludhiana

7 November 2016
12:00

India	58-45	Sweden

Kabaddi Stadium, Moonak, Sangrur

7 November 2016
13:00

England	41-35	Canada

Kabaddi Stadium, Moonak, Sangrur

7 November 2016
14:00

Sierra Leone	70-6	Sri Lanka

Kabaddi Stadium, Moonak, Sangrur

9 November 2016

Sweden	23-59	Canada

Sports Stadium, Rode, Moga

9 November 2016

Sierra Leone	30-48	England

Sports Stadium, Rode, Moga

9 November 2016

India	49-35	Sri Lanka

Sports Stadium, Rode, Moga

12 November 2016

India	54-35	Canada

Baba Kala Mehar Stadium, Barnala

12 November 2016

Sweden	35-43	Sierra Leone

Baba Kala Mehar Stadium, Barnala

12 November 2016

England	62-21	Sri Lanka

Baba Kala Mehar Stadium, Barnala

14 November 2016

India	56-37	England

Govt. Ripudaman College Stadium, Nabha, Patiala

14 November 2016

Canada	48-35	Sierra Leone

Govt. Ripudaman College Stadium, Nabha, Patiala

14 November 2016

Sweden	55-23	Sri Lanka

Govt. Ripudaman College Stadium, Nabha, Patiala

==== Pool B ====
Team	Pld	W	D	L	SF	SA	SD	Pts
Iran	5	5	0	0	304	151	153	10
United States	5	4	0	1	255	185	70	8
Australia	5	3	0	2	214	193	21	6
Kenya	5	2	0	3	226	240	-14	4
Argentina	5	1	0	4	169	259	-90	2
Tanzania	5	0	0	5	148	288	-140	0

Qualified for semifinals

4 November 2016
16:15

Argentina	52-32	Tanzania

Government College Stadium, Gurdaspur

4 November 2016
17:45

Australia	61-36	Kenya

Government College Stadium, Gurdaspur

5 November 2016
16:30

Iran	65-23	Tanzania

Shaheed Kartar Singh Sarabha Sports Stadium, Sarabha, Ludhiana

6 November 2016
12:25

Iran	57-31	Australia

Sports Stadium, Attari, Amritsar

6 November 2016
13:30

United States	55-31	Kenya

Sports Stadium, Attari, Amritsar

7 November 2016
16:00

Iran	72-27	Argentina

Kabaddi Stadium, Moonak, Sangrur

8 November 2016
12:15

Argentina	35-64	United States

Kabaddi Ground, Begowal, Kapurthala

8 November 2016

Iran	65-36	Kenya

Kabaddi Ground, Begowal, Kapurthala

8 November 2016

Australia	53-32	Tanzania

Kabaddi Ground, Begowal, Kapurthala

9 November 2016

United States	47-38	Australia

Sports Stadium, Rode, Moga

10 November 2016

Tanzania	36-55	United States

Sports Stadium, Adampur, Jalandhar

10 November 2016

Australia	31-21	Argentina

Sports Stadium, Adampur, Jalandhar

12 November 2016

Kenya	63-25	Tanzania

Baba Kala Mehar Stadium, Barnala

13 November 2016

Iran	45-34	United States

Guru Arjun Dev Sports Stadium, Chohla Sahib, Tarn Taran

13 November 2016

Kenya	60-34	Argentina

Guru Arjun Dev Sports Stadium, Chohla Sahib, Tarn Taran

=== Knockout stage ===
Semi-finals
15 November – Yadwindra Stadium, Mehraj, Bathinda
England	41
Iran	39
16 November – Guru Gobind Singh Multipurpose Stadium, Badal, Bathinda
India	57
United States	40

Final
17 November – Multipurpose Sports Stadium, Jalalabad, Fazilka
India	62
England	20
Third place
17 November – Multipurpose Sports Stadium, Jalalabad, Fazilka
United States	43
Iran	39

==== Semi-finals ====
15 November 2016
13:00

England	41-39 ET	Iran

Yadwindra Stadium, Mehraj, Bathinda

16 November 2016
17:40

India	57-40	United States

Guru Gobind Singh Multipurpose Stadium, Badal, Bathinda

==== Third place ====
17 November 2016
14:55

United States	43-39	Iran

Multipurpose Sports Stadium, Jalalabad, Fazilka

=== Final match ===
17 November 2016
17:37

India	62-20	England

Multipurpose Sports Stadium, Jalalabad, Fazilka

== Schedule (Women’s) ==
Note: All matches' timings are according to Indian Standard Time (UTC +5:30).

=== Group stage ===
==== Pool A ====
Team	Pld	W	D	L	SF	SA	SD	Pts
India	3	3	0	0	131	48	83	6
Kenya	3	2	0	1	97	80	17	4
Sri Lanka	3	1	0	2	72	112	-40	2
Mexico	3	0	0	3	56	116	-60	0

Qualified for semifinals

5 November 2016
15:35

India	45-15	Kenya

Shaheed Kartar Singh Sarabha Sports Stadium, Sarabha, Ludhiana

6 November 2016
15:45

Sri Lanka	36-24	Mexico

Sports Stadium, Attari, Amritsar

7 November 2016
15:00

India	35-21	Mexico

Kabaddi Stadium, Moonak, Sangrur

9 November 2016

Mexico	11-45	Kenya

Sports Stadium, Rode, Moga

12 November 2016

Kenya	37-24	Sri Lanka

Baba Kala Mehar Stadium, Barnala

14 November 2016

India	51-12	Sri Lanka

Govt. Ripudaman College Stadium, Nabha, Patiala

==== Pool B ====
Team	Pld	W	D	L	SF	SA	SD	Pts
United States	3	3	0	0	119	74	45	6
New Zealand	3	2	0	1	163	61	102	4
Sierra Leone	3	1	0	2	95	109	-14	2
Tanzania	3	0	0	3	58	191	-133	0

Qualified for semifinals

4 November 2016
19:08

New Zealand	88-15	Tanzania

Government College Stadium, Gurdaspur

6 November 2016
14:30

United States	37-28	Sierra Leone

Sports Stadium, Attari, Amritsar

8 November 2016

United States	53-18	Tanzania

Kabaddi Ground, Begowal, Kapurthala

10 November 2016

New Zealand	47-17	Sierra Leone

Sports Stadium, Adampur, Jalandhar

13 November 2016

United States	29-28	New Zealand

Guru Arjun Dev Sports Stadium, Chohla Sahib, Tarn Taran

13 November 2016

Sierra Leone	50-25	Tanzania

Guru Arjun Dev Sports Stadium, Chohla Sahib, Tarn Taran

=== Knockout stage ===
Semi-finals
15 November – Yadwindra Stadium, Mehraj, Bathinda
India	43
New Zealand	20
16 November – Guru Gobind Singh Multipurpose Stadium, Badal, Bathinda
United States	41
Kenya	20

Final
17 November – Multipurpose Sports Stadium, Jalalabad, Fazilka
India	45
United States	10
Third place
17 November – Multipurpose Sports Stadium, Jalalabad, Fazilka
New Zealand	42
Kenya	21

==== Semi-finals ====
15 November 2016
15:00

India	43-20	New Zealand

Yadwindra Stadium, Mehraj, Bathinda

16 November 2016
16:40

United States	41-20	Kenya

Guru Gobind Singh Multipurpose Stadium, Badal, Bathinda

==== Third place ====
17 November 2016
13:55

New Zealand	42-21	Kenya

Multipurpose Sports Stadium, Jalalabad, Fazilka

==== Final match ====
17 November 2016
16:27

India	45-10	United States

Multipurpose Sports Stadium, Jalalabad, Fazilka

== Broadcasting ==
Television

Countries	Broadcaster
India	PTC News
United Kingdom; European Union	PTC Punjabi

== See also ==
- 2020 Kabaddi World Cup (Circle style)
- Kabaddi World Cup (Circle style)
