= Arpana Chaudhary =

Personal information
- Nationality: Nepali
- Born: 18 August 1993 (age 33)
- Occupation: Kabaddi player

Sport
- Sport: Kabaddi
- Club: Nepal Police Club
Medal record
Women's kabaddi
Representing Nepal
Asian Games
Bronze medal – third place	2022 Hangzhou	Women's team

Arpana Chaudhary (born 18 August 1993) is a Nepali kabaddi player who represents the Nepal Police Club. She was a member of the Nepal women's national kabaddi team that won the bronze medal at the 2022 Asian Games in Hangzhou, China.

== Kabaddi career ==
Chaudhary was associated with the Nepal Police Club before her selection for the 2022 Asian Games. She was listed as an alternative player for Nepal's women's kabaddi team for the 2016 South Asian Games.

In 2023, Chaudhary was selected for Nepal's women's kabaddi team for the 2022 Asian Games in Hangzhou. She was one of three Nepal Police players in the squad, alongside Manmati Bist and Nitu Gurung.

At the Games, Nepal won the bronze medal in the women's kabaddi tournament after reaching the semifinals. It was Nepal's first medal in women's kabaddi at the Asian Games. Chaudhary was one of the 12 members of the bronze medal-winning team.

Following the Games, Chaudhary was among the Nepal Police players recognised for their contribution to the team's bronze-medal achievement. She received a cash award and certificate during a ceremony attended by Prime Minister Pushpa Kamal Dahal.

In June 2024, Chaudhary was among the members of Nepal's women's kabaddi team who received a cash award of NPR 390,000 each for winning the bronze medal at the Asian Games.
