= Ritu Mitharwal =

Indian kabaddi player

Ritu Mitharwal is an Indian Kabaddi player from Haryana. She plays for the Indian women's national kabaddi team and for Haryana in the domestic tournaments. She is an all-rounder and defender.

She is from Kalali village, Charkhi Dadri district, Haryana. Her father Vijay Singh is a farmer and her mother is Krishna Devi.

She was a part of the Indian women's national kabaddi team that won gold at the 2025 Women's Kabaddi World Cup in Bangladesh in November 2025.
