= Beach kabaddi at the 2026 Asian Beach Games =

- Venue: Haiyue Square Beach
- Date: 23–26 April 2026

Beach kabaddi competition at the 2026 Asian Beach Games was held at the Haiyue Square Beach in Sanya, China from 23 to 26 April 2026.

== Medalists ==
Event	Gold	Silver	Bronze
Men	Iran; Mobin Nazari; Mahan Faraji; Moslem Rashki; Ali Sourtechi; Mohammad Mallak; Amir Hossein Alizadeh	India; Brijendra Singh Choudhary; Jitendra Yadav; Jai Bhagwan; Neeraj Narwal; Bhanu Pratap Tomar; Yatharth Deshwal	Sri Lanka; Dilan Sanjaya; Ruwan Samarakoon; Aabith Aqar; Saminda Santhushta; Milinda Chathuranga; Mohammed Ansaf
Men	Iran; Mobin Nazari; Mahan Faraji; Moslem Rashki; Ali Sourtechi; Mohammad Mallak; Amir Hossein Alizadeh	India; Brijendra Singh Choudhary; Jitendra Yadav; Jai Bhagwan; Neeraj Narwal; Bhanu Pratap Tomar; Yatharth Deshwal	Pakistan; Kashif Razzaq; Farhan Ali; Muhammad Jamshaid; Muhammad Zohaib Niaz; Waqar Ali; Usman Ahmed
Women	India; Ritu Sheoran; Manisha Kumari; Simran Kamboj; Manpreet Kaur; Nikita Kumari; Nikita Chauhan	Sri Lanka; Diluxshana Vimalenthiran; Kajenthini Rasa; Kumuduni Bandara; Priyavarna Rasathurai; Madurika Hansamali; Shanika Sudarshani	Bangladesh; Sraboni Mollick; Most Srity Akhter; Brishti Biswas; Meybi Chakma; Anzuara Ratry; Khadiza Khatun
Women	India; Ritu Sheoran; Manisha Kumari; Simran Kamboj; Manpreet Kaur; Nikita Kumari; Nikita Chauhan	Sri Lanka; Diluxshana Vimalenthiran; Kajenthini Rasa; Kumuduni Bandara; Priyavarna Rasathurai; Madurika Hansamali; Shanika Sudarshani	Nepal; Nanu Maya Parajuli; Manmati Bist; Mina Nepali; Rabina Chaudhary; Srijana Kumari Tharu; Anuja Kulung Rai

== Medal table ==
Rank	Nation	Gold	Silver	Bronze	Total
1	India (IND)	1	1	0	2
2	Iran (IRI)	1	0	0	1
3	Sri Lanka (SRI)	0	1	1	2
4	Bangladesh (BAN)	0	0	1	1
4	Nepal (NEP)	0	0	1	1
4	Pakistan (PAK)	0	0	1	1
Totals (6 entries)		2	2	4	8

== Results ==
=== Men ===
==== Preliminary round ====
===== Group A =====
Pos	Team	Pld	W	D	L	PF	PA	PD	Pts
1	Iran	3	3	0	0	138	90	+48	6
2	Pakistan	3	2	0	1	128	93	+35	4
3	Bangladesh	3	1	0	2	115	113	+2	2
4	Syria	3	0	0	3	79	164	−85	0

Source: Official website

23 April
9:00

Pakistan	28–38 (HT: 13–20)	Iran
	Report

Haiyue Square Beach, Sanya

23 April
16:00

Bangladesh	54–23 (HT: 29–8)	Syria
	Report

Haiyue Square Beach, Sanya

24 April
9:00

Pakistan	43–30 (HT: 22–15)	Bangladesh
	Report

Haiyue Square Beach, Sanya

25 April
9:00

Pakistan	57–25 (HT: 32–13)	Syria
	Report

Haiyue Square Beach, Sanya

25 April
16:00

Iran	47–31 (HT: 23–16)	Bangladesh
	Report

Haiyue Square Beach, Sanya

26 April
9:00

Iran	53–31 (HT: 30–14)	Syria
	Report

Haiyue Square Beach, Sanya

===== Group B =====
Pos	Team	Pld	W	D	L	PF	PA	PD	Pts
1	India	3	3	0	0	172	88	+84	6
2	Sri Lanka	3	2	0	1	129	100	+29	4
3	Thailand	3	1	0	2	117	122	−5	2
4	Chinese Taipei	3	0	0	3	67	175	−108	0

Source: Official website

23 April
10:00

India	66–23 (HT: 27–13)	Chinese Taipei
	Report

Haiyue Square Beach, Sanya

23 April
17:00

Thailand	29–43 (HT: 12–24)	Sri Lanka
	Report

Haiyue Square Beach, Sanya

24 April
10:00

India	52–32 (HT: 28–15)	Thailand
	Report

Haiyue Square Beach, Sanya

25 April
10:00

India	54–33 (HT: 27–16)	Sri Lanka
	Report

Haiyue Square Beach, Sanya

25 April
17:00

Thailand	56–27 (HT: 27–16)	Chinese Taipei
	Report

Haiyue Square Beach, Sanya

26 April
10:00

Chinese Taipei	17–53 (HT: 4–33)	Sri Lanka
	Report

Haiyue Square Beach, Sanya

==== Knockout round ====
Semifinals
26 April
Iran	42
Sri Lanka	29
26 April
Pakistan	28
India	50

Gold medal match
27 April
Iran	44
India	31

===== Semifinals =====
26 April
16:00

Iran	42–29 (HT: 25–13)	Sri Lanka
	Report

Haiyue Square Beach, Sanya

26 April
17:00

Pakistan	28–50 (HT: 13–24)	India
	Report

Haiyue Square Beach, Sanya

===== Gold medal match =====
27 April
16:00

Iran	44–31 (HT: 23–11)	India
	Report

Haiyue Square Beach, Sanya

=== Women ===
==== Preliminary round ====
===== Group A =====
Pos	Team	Pld	W	D	L	PF	PA	PD	Pts
1	India	2	2	0	0	108	54	+54	4
2	Sri Lanka	2	1	0	1	83	63	+20	2
3	Syria	2	0	0	2	41	115	−74	0

Source: Official website

23 April
9:00

India	44–32 (HT: 21–16)	Sri Lanka
	Report

Haiyue Square Beach, Sanya

24 April
9:00

India	64–22 (HT: 35–7)	Syria
	Report

Haiyue Square Beach, Sanya

25 April
9:00

Sri Lanka	51–19 (HT: 28–7)	Syria
	Report

Haiyue Square Beach, Sanya

===== Group B =====
Pos	Team	Pld	W	D	L	PF	PA	PD	Pts
1	Nepal	3	3	0	0	135	101	+34	6
2	Bangladesh	3	2	0	1	146	92	+54	4
3	Thailand	3	1	0	2	115	128	−13	2
4	Chinese Taipei	3	0	0	3	80	155	−75	0

Source: Official website

23 April
10:00

Thailand	34–51 (HT: 16–26)	Bangladesh
	Report

Haiyue Square Beach, Sanya

23 April
16:00

Chinese Taipei	32–48 (HT: 13–26)	Nepal
	Report

Haiyue Square Beach, Sanya

24 April
10:00

Thailand	48–28 (HT: 24–15)	Chinese Taipei
	Report

Haiyue Square Beach, Sanya

25 April
10:00

Thailand	33–49 (HT: 15–23)	Nepal
	Report

Haiyue Square Beach, Sanya

25 April
16:00

Bangladesh	59–20 (HT: 25–11)	Chinese Taipei
	Report

Haiyue Square Beach, Sanya

26 April
9:00

Bangladesh	36–38 (HT: 17–19)	Nepal
	Report

Haiyue Square Beach, Sanya

==== Knockout round ====
Semifinals
26 April
India	50
Bangladesh	31
26 April
Sri Lanka	46
Nepal	23

Gold medal match
27 April
India	47
Sri Lanka	31

===== Semifinals =====
26 April
16:00

India	50–31 (HT: 22–15)	Bangladesh
	Report

Haiyue Square Beach, Sanya

26 April
17:00

Sri Lanka	46–23 (HT: 24–12)	Nepal
	Report

Haiyue Square Beach, Sanya

===== Gold medal match =====
27 April
10:00

India	47–31 (HT: 20–18)	Sri Lanka
	Report

Haiyue Square Beach, Sanya
