= Anu Kumari =

Indian kabaddi player

Anu Kumari is an Indian kabaddi player from Uttar Pradesh. She plays for the Indian women's national kabaddi team and for Uttar Pradesh in the domestic tournaments. She is a raider.

Kumari is from Kakra village, Shahpur block, Muzaffarnagar district, Uttar Pradesh. She is employed as a police constable in Ghaziabad.

She was a part of the Indian women's national kabaddi team that won gold in the Women's Kabaddi World Cup 2025 organised by International Kabaddi Federation in Bangladesh in November 2025. After returning from the World Cup victory, she was felicitated by the city Police Commissioner in Ghaziabad and presented with a cash award of Rs. 50,000.
