= Muskan Malik =

Muskan Malik may refer to:

- Muskan Malik (cricketer) (born 2002), Indian cricketer
- Muskan Malik (kabaddi) (born 2000), Indian kabaddi player
