= Isha Rai =

Nepali kabaddi player (born 1998)

Personal information
- Nationality: Nepali
- Born: 11 May 1998 (age 28)
- Occupation: Kabaddi player

Sport
- Sport: Kabaddi
- Club: Nepal Army
Medal record
Women's Kabaddi
Representing Nepal
Asian Games
Bronze medal – third place	2022 Hangzhou	Team competition

Isha Rai is a Nepali kabaddi player. She represented Nepal in the women's kabaddi tournament at the 2022 Asian Games in Hangzhou, China, where Nepal won the bronze medal. She is associated with the Nepal Army.

== Career ==
Rai was selected as one of 12 players in Nepal's women's kabaddi team for the 2022 Asian Games. She was one of three players from the Nepal Army in the squad, alongside Ganga Ghimire and Anuja Kulung Rai.

In August 2023, Rai was included in the Nepal women's kabaddi team that travelled to Haryana, India, for a 30-day special training programme and seven practice matches in preparation for the Asian Games. The training programme was conducted at Gurukul Academy.

At the 2022 Asian Games, Nepal's women's team reached the semifinals and secured the bronze medal. Rai was a member of the medal-winning squad.
