= Pushpa Rana =

Indian kabaddi player

Personal information
- Nationality: Indian
- Born: 11 January 1998 (age 28)
- Height: 1.68 m (5 ft 6 in)
Medal record
Women's kabaddi
Representing India
Asian Games
Gold medal – first place	2026 Aichi–Nagoya	Team
Gold medal – first place	2022 Hangzhou	Team

Pushpa Rana (ᱯᱩᱥᱯᱟ ᱨᱟᱱᱟ, born 11 January 1998) is an Indian kabaddi player from Himachal Pradesh. She was part of the Indian team that won the gold medal at the 2022 Asian Games, by defeating Chinese Taipei in the final.

== Personal life ==
Pushpa is from Millah village in the Shillai area of Himachal Pradesh's Giri Par region in Sirmaur district.
