= Mina Nepali =

Nepali kabaddi player

Personal information
- Native name: मीना नेपाली
- Nationality: Nepali
- Born: 18 July 2007 (age 19)
- Occupation: Kabaddi player

Sport
- Sport: Kabaddi
Medal record
Women's kabaddi
Representing Nepal
Asian Championship
Bronze medal – third place	2025 Tehran	Team competition
Asian Games
Bronze medal – third place	2022 Hangzhou	Team competition
Bronze medal – third place	2026 Aichi-Nagoya	Team competition
Asian Beach Games
Bronze medal – third place	2026 Sanya	Team competition

Mina Nepali (Nepali: मीना नेपाली, born 18 July 2007) is a Nepali kabaddi player who represents the Nepal women's national kabaddi team. She has represented Nepal in international competitions including the Asian Games, Asian Women's Kabaddi Championship, Asian Beach Games and the Kabaddi World Cup. She was part of Nepal's bronze-medal-winning women's kabaddi team at the 2022 Asian Games and 2026 Asian Games.

== Kabaddi career ==
Nepali was selected for Nepal's women's kabaddi team for the 2022 Asian Games in Hangzhou, China, which were held in 2023 after being postponed. Nepal reached the semifinals of the women's kabaddi tournament and secured the bronze medal. Nepali was part of the squad that represented Nepal at the Games.

In March 2025, Nepali was part of Nepal's squad at the 2025 Asian Women's Kabaddi Championship in Tehran, Iran. Nepal won the bronze medal after reaching the semifinals of the tournament.

In July 2025, Nepali was selected for Nepal's squad for the 2025 Women's Kabaddi World Cup in Hyderabad, India. She was one of 14 players selected for the tournament, with Manmati Bist as captain and Jayanti Badu as vice-captain.

In 2026, Nepali represented Nepal in women's beach kabaddi at the 2026 Asian Beach Games in Sanya, China. She was part of Nepal's six-player squad, which also included Manmati Bist, Rabina Chaudhary, Srijana Kumari Tharu, Anuja Kulung Rai and Nanu Maya Parajuli. Nepal won the bronze medal after reaching the semifinals.

Nepali was selected for Nepal's women's kabaddi team for the 2026 Asian Games in Aichi-Nagoya, Japan. She was included in the squad that trained in India before travelling to Japan for the Games.

Nepal advanced to the semifinals of the women's kabaddi tournament and secured a bronze medal. Nepali was part of the team that won Nepal's second consecutive Asian Games bronze medal in women's kabaddi.
