= Pooja Hathwala =

Indian kabaddi player

Personal information
- Other names: Pooja Kajla
- Nationality: Indian

Sport
- Sport: Kabaddi
Medal record
Women's Kabaddi
Representing India
Asian Games
Gold medal – first place	2022 Hangzhou	Women's team
Gold medal – first place	2026 Aichi–Nagoya	Women's team

Pooja Hathwala, also known as Pooja Kajla, is an Indian kabaddi player. She was part of the team that won the gold medal at the 2022 Asian Games. In August 2026, she was conferred with the Arjuna Award for 2025. She is from Hathwala village in Jind district, Haryana.
