= 2026 Commonwealth Kabaddi Championship =

Inaugural edition of the Commonwealth Kabaddi Championship

Tournament information
- Sport: Kabaddi
- Location: Veer Savarkar Sports Complex, Ahmedabad, Gujarat, India
- Dates: 23–31 October, 2026
- Host: India
- Venue: Veer Savarkar Sports Complex
- Participants: W: 10; M: 13
- Number of events: 2 (Men and Women)
- Broadcast: Jio Star

Final positions
- Champions: India M India W

Tournament statistics
- Matches played: 62; W: 23; M: 39

The 2026 Commonwealth Kabaddi Championship was the inaugural edition of the Commonwealth Kabaddi Championship. It was held at the Veer Savarkar Sports Complex in Ahmedabad, Gujarat, India, featuring national men's and women's teams from across the Commonwealth nations to promote the sport towards future inclusion in the main Commonwealth Games program.

== Medal Table ==
Event	Gold	Silver	Bronze
Men's	India	Sri Lanka	Kenya
Men's	India	Sri Lanka	Bangladesh
Women's	India	Uganda	Kenya
Women's	India	Uganda	Sri Lanka

== Venue ==
All matches of the tournament are hosted on dual courts at the Veer Savarkar Sports Complex located in the Naranpura neighborhood of Ahmedabad.

== Tournament format ==
- Events: Men's tournament and Women's tournament.
- Format: Round-robin pool stage followed by knockout rounds (semi-finals and finals). The top teams from each pool advance to the knockouts.
- Scoring system: 2 points for a win, 1 point for a draw, and 0 points for a loss.

== Participating nations ==
A total of 13 nations feature teams grouped into pools for both categories:

Participating Teams
Nation	Men's Team	Women's Team
Australia	Yes	No
Bangladesh	Yes	Yes
Canada	Yes	No
England	Yes	Yes
India	Yes	Yes
Kenya	Yes	Yes
Malaysia	Yes	Yes
Nigeria	Yes	Yes
Scotland	Yes	Yes
Singapore	Yes	Yes
Sri Lanka	Yes	Yes
Tanzania	Yes	No
Uganda	Yes	Yes

== Schedule ==
The tournament spans 9 days featuring dual-court pool matches, leading up to the knockouts and the grand final.

Tournament Stage Overview
Date	Phase
October 23–29	Group Stage
October 30	Semi-finals
October 31	Final

== Men's ==
=== Group A ===
==== Table ====
Pos	Team	Pld	W	D	L	GF	GA	GD	Pts	Qualification
1	India	6	6	0	0	270	146	+124	12	Semi-finals
2	Sri Lanka	6	5	0	1	261	164	+97	10	Semi-finals
3	Uganda	6	4	0	2	263	188	+75	8	
4	Malaysia	6	3	0	3	256	200	+56	6	
5	Tanzania	6	2	0	4	197	218	−21	4	
6	England	6	1	0	5	194	252	−58	2	
7	Nigeria	6	0	0	6	114	387	−273	0	

Source: Pro Kabaddi League

==== Matches ====
23 October 2026
12:00

Tanzania	21 – 48	Sri Lanka

Sri Lanka won by 27 points

23 October 2026
20:30

India	46 – 26	England

India won by 20 points

23 October 2026
21:30

Malaysia	29 – 45	Uganda

Uganda won by 16 points

24 October 2026
12:00

Malaysia	28 – 50	Sri Lanka

Sri Lanka won by 22 points

24 October 2026
20:00

India	44 – 30	Uganda

India won by 14 points

24 October 2026
21:00

Nigeria	17 – 66	Tanzania

Tanzania won by 49 points

25 October 2026
12:00

Uganda	34 – 36	Sri Lanka

Sri Lanka won by 2 points

25 October 2026
13:00

Nigeria	18 – 68	England

England won by 50 points

25 October 2026
20:00

India	37 – 23	Malaysia

India won by 14 points

26 October 2026
12:00

Malaysia	43 – 26	Tanzania

Malaysia won by 27 points

26 October 2026
13:00

Uganda	47 – 22	England

Uganda won by 25 points

26 October 2026
20:00

India	50 – 23	Nigeria

India won by 27 points

27 October 2026
19:00

Malaysia	55 – 29	England

Malaysia won by 26 points

27 October 2026
20:00

India	48 – 20	Tanzania

India won by 28 points

27 October 2026
21:00

Nigeria	14 – 53	Sri Lanka

Sri Lanka won by 39 points

28 October 2026
18:00

Nigeria	13 – 78	Malaysia

Malaysia won by 65 points

28 October 2026
20:00

Uganda	35 – 28	Tanzania

Uganda won by 7 points

28 October 2026
21:00

England	22 – 50	Sri Lanka

Sri Lanka won by 28 points

29 October 2026
15:00

England	27 – 36	Tanzania

Tanzania won by 9 points

29 October 2026
18:00

Nigeria	29 – 72	Uganda

Uganda won by 43 points

29 October 2026
20:00

India	45 – 24	Sri Lanka

India won by 21 points

=== Group B ===
==== Table ====
Pos	Team	Pld	W	D	L	GF	GA	GD	Pts	Qualification
1	Kenya	5	5	0	0	285	121	+164	10	Semi-finals
2	Bangladesh	5	4	0	1	297	139	+158	8	Semi-finals
3	Canada	5	3	0	2	229	212	+17	6	
4	Singapore	5	2	0	3	203	213	−10	4	
5	Scotland	5	1	0	4	152	292	−140	2	
6	Australia	5	0	0	5	148	337	−189	0	

Source: Pro Kabaddi League

==== Matches ====
23 October 2026
11:00

Kenya	48 – 28	Singapore

Kenya won by 20 points

23 October 2026
13:00

Australia	30 – 59	Scotland

Scotland won by 29 points

24 October 2026
11:00

Bangladesh	67 – 28	Canada

Bangladesh won by 39 points

24 October 2026
13:00

Scotland	28 – 50	Singapore

Singapore won by 22 points

25 October 2026
11:00

Canada	74 – 28	Australia

Canada won by 46 points

25 October 2026
21:00

Bangladesh	31 – 32	Kenya

Kenya won by 1 point

26 October 2026
11:00

Australia	32 – 59	Singapore

Singapore won by 27 points

26 October 2026
21:00

Kenya	80 – 15	Scotland

Kenya won by 65 points

27 October 2026
16:00

Bangladesh	60 – 28	Singapore

Bangladesh won by 32 points

27 October 2026
18:00

Canada	62 – 30	Scotland

Canada won by 32 points

28 October 2026
16:00

Kenya	49 – 20	Canada

Kenya won by 29 points

28 October 2026
19:00

Bangladesh	69 – 31	Australia

Bangladesh won by 38 points

29 October 2026
16:00

Bangladesh	70 – 20	Scotland

Bangladesh won by 50 points

29 October 2026
19:00

Canada	45 – 38	Singapore

Canada won by 7 points

29 October 2026
20:00

Kenya	76 – 27	Australia

Kenya won by 49 points

=== Knockout stage ===
==== Bracket ====
Semi-finals
30 October – 20:00
India	56
Bangladesh	27
30 October – 21:00
Kenya	24
Sri Lanka	28

Final
31 October – 21:00
India	54
Sri Lanka	20

==== Semi finals ====
30 October 2026
20:00

India	56 – 27	Bangladesh

India won by 29 points

30 October 2026
21:00

Kenya	24 – 28	Sri Lanka

Sri Lanka won by 4 points

==== Final ====
31 October 2026
21:00

India	54 – 20	Sri Lanka

India won by 34 points

== Women's ==
=== Group A ===
==== Table ====
Pos	Team	Pld	W	D	L	GF	GA	GD	Pts	Qualification
1	India	4	4	0	0	184	57	+127	8	Semi-finals
2	Uganda	4	3	0	1	179	98	+81	6	Semi-finals
3	Malaysia	4	2	0	2	161	133	+28	4	
4	Nigeria	4	1	0	3	83	186	−103	2	
5	Singapore	4	0	0	4	65	198	−133	0	

Source: Pro Kabaddi League

==== Matches ====
23 October 2026
15:30

Singapore	12 – 61	Uganda

Uganda won by 49 points

23 October 2026
18:45

India	73 – 13	Malaysia

India won by 60 points

24 October 2026
16:15

Nigeria	8 – 63	Malaysia

Malaysia won by 55 points

24 October 2026
18:45

India	32 – 16	Singapore

India won by 16 points

25 October 2026
15:30

Singapore	20 – 43	Nigeria

Nigeria won by 23 points

25 October 2026
18:45

India	41 – 18	Uganda

India won by 23 points

26 October 2026
15:30

Uganda	35 – 23	Malaysia

Uganda won by 12 points

26 October 2026
18:45

India	38 – 10	Nigeria

India won by 28 points

27 October 2026
14:00

Singapore	17 – 62	Malaysia

Malaysia won by 45 points

28 October 2026
14:00

Nigeria	22 – 65	Uganda

Nigeria won by 43 points

=== Group B ===
==== Table ====
Pos	Team	Pld	W	D	L	GF	GA	GD	Pts	Qualification
1	Kenya	4	4	0	0	200	67	+133	8	Semi-finals
2	Sri Lanka	4	3	0	1	169	69	+100	6	Semi-finals
3	Bangladesh	4	2	0	2	199	93	+106	4	
4	Scotland	4	1	0	3	94	225	−131	2	
5	England	4	0	0	4	71	279	−208	0	

Source: Pro Kabaddi League

==== Matches ====
23 October 2026
16:15

Bangladesh	25 – 34	Kenya

Kenya won by 9 points

23 October 2026
18:00

Scotland	10 – 53	Sri Lanka

Sri Lanka won by 43 points

24 October 2026
15:30

Kenya	23 – 20	Sri Lanka

Kenya won by 3 points

24 October 2026
18:00

England	36 – 53	Scotland

Scotland won by 27 points

25 October 2026
16:15

England	16 – 65	Sri Lanka

Sri Lanka won by 49 points

25 October 2026
18:00

Bangladesh	75 – 15	Scotland

Bangladesh won by 60 points

26 October 2026
16:15

Bangladesh	20 – 31	Sri Lanka

Sri Lanka won by 11 points

26 October 2026
18:00

Kenya	82 – 6	England

Kenya won by 76 points

27 October 2026
13:00

Kenya	61 – 16	Scotland

Kenya won by 45 points

28 October 2026
13:00

Bangladesh	79 – 13	England

Bangladesh won by 66 points

=== Knockout stage ===
==== Bracket ====
Semi-finals
30 October – 18:45
India	39
Sri Lanka	14
30 October – 18:00
Kenya	21
Uganda	23

Final
31 October – 19:30
India	35
Uganda	15

==== Semi finals ====
30 October 2026
18:00

Kenya	21 – 23	Uganda

Uganda won by 2 points

30 October 2026
18:45

India	39 – 14	Sri Lanka

India won by 25 points

==== Final ====
31 October 2026
19:30

India	35 – 15	Uganda

India won by 20 points

== Broadcasting ==
The tournament features live television coverage and streaming across platforms such as the Star Sports Network and digital streaming services in India, with international timing accommodations accounting for global audiences.

== See also ==
- Kabaddi at the Asian Games
- Amateur Kabaddi Federation of India
