= Kalawati Pant =

Nepali kabaddi player

Personal information
- Native name: कलावती पन्त
- Nationality: Nepali
- Born: 22 August 2004 Shuklaphanta, Kanchanpur District, Nepal
- Occupation: Kabaddi player

Sport
- Sport: Kabaddi
- Club: Sudurpaschim Province
Medal record
Women's kabaddi
Representing Nepal
Bronze medal – third place	2022 Asian Games	Team competition

Kalawati Pant (Nepali: कलावती पन्त; born 22 August 2004) is a Nepali kabaddi player. She represented Nepal at the 2022 Asian Games in Hangzhou, China, where Nepal won the bronze medal in women's kabaddi. She also represented Sudurpaschim Province in national competitions and captained the province's women's kabaddi team at the Ninth National Games.

== Early life and career ==
Pant is from Shuklaphanta Municipality, Kanchanpur District, Nepal. She began playing kabaddi while studying in grade 9 at Dharma Janata Secondary School. Her school sports teacher, Ganesh Dhami, encouraged her to pursue kabaddi.

Pant initially played as the captain of her school's girls' kabaddi team and participated in school-level competitions. She progressed to national competition and later underwent a three-month residential training programme at the Kabaddi Training Centre in Mahendranagar before the Ninth National Games.

== Kabaddi career ==
Pant made her national-level debut at a competition in Janakpur. She later captained the Sudurpaschim Province women's kabaddi team at the Ninth National Games in Pokhara.

In June 2023, Pant was selected for Nepal's women's kabaddi team for the 2022 Asian Games in Hangzhou, China, which were held in 2023 after being postponed. She was one of 12 players selected for the tournament and was the only player from Sudurpaschim Province in the squad.

The Nepal Olympic Committee also included Pant in the national team's special training programme in Haryana, India, held in preparation for the Asian Games.

At the 2022 Asian Games, Pant was part of Nepal's women's kabaddi team. Nepal defeated Bangladesh in the group stage before losing to Iran and India. The team reached the semifinals and secured the bronze medal.
