= Srijana Kumari Tharu =

Nepali kabaddi player

Personal information
- Native name: सृजना कुमारी थारु
- Nationality: Nepali
- Born: 24 June 2000 (age 26)
- Occupation: Kabaddi player

Sport
- Sport: Kabaddi
Medal record
Women's kabaddi
Representing Nepal
Asian Games
| Bronze medal – third place | 2022 Hangzhou | Team competition |
| Bronze medal – third place | 2026 Aichi-Nagoya | Team competition |
Asian Beach Games
| Bronze medal – third place | 2026 Sanya | Team competition |

Srijana Kumari Tharu (Nepali: सृजना कुमारी थारु, born 24 June 2000) is a Nepali kabaddi player who represents the Nepal women's national kabaddi team. She has represented Nepal at the Asian Games, Asian Beach Games and the Kabaddi World Cup. She was part of Nepal's bronze-medal-winning women's kabaddi team at the 2022 Asian Games and 2026 Asian Games, and won a bronze medal in women's beach kabaddi at the 2026 Asian Beach Games.

== Kabaddi career ==
Tharu was selected as a member of Nepal's women's kabaddi team for the 2022 Asian Games in Hangzhou, China, which were held in 2023 after being postponed. Nepal defeated Bangladesh in the group stage and advanced to the semifinals, where it lost to India. The result secured Nepal a bronze medal in its debut women's kabaddi appearance at the Asian Games. Tharu was one of the 12 players in the tournament squad.

The Nepal Olympic Committee also included Tharu in the national team's special training programme in Haryana, India, held in preparation for the Asian Games.

In 2025, Tharu was selected for Nepal's squad for the 2025 Women's Kabaddi World Cup in Hyderabad, India. She was one of 14 players selected for the tournament, alongside captain Manmati Bist and vice-captain Jayanti Badu.

In April 2026, Tharu represented Nepal in women's beach kabaddi at the 2026 Asian Beach Games in Sanya, China. She was part of the six-player Nepali team that included Manmati Bist, Mina Nepali, Rabina Chaudhary, Anuja Kulung Rai and Nanu Maya Parajuli. Nepal won the bronze medal in the competition.

Tharu was selected again for Nepal's women's kabaddi team for the 2026 Asian Games in Aichi-Nagoya, Japan. She was included in the squad that trained in India before travelling to Japan for the Games.
