= Sanju Devi (kabaddi) =

Indian kabaddi player

Sanju Devi (19 December 2002) is an Indian kabaddi player from Chhattisgarh. She plays for the Indian women's national kabaddi team as a raider.

== Early life ==
She was born in Kerakachhar village in the Pali block of Korba district, Chhattisgarh. She started playing kabaddi in Class 5 at the government school in her village. Anuj Pratap Singh was her first coach under whom she learnt her basics. She is the first kabaddi woman player from Chhattisgarh to represent India. After travelling from her village to Korba to play kabaddi which used to take about three hours of her travel time daily, she joined the Women's Residential Kabaddi Academy in Bilaspur, Chhattisgarh, where she trained under coach Dil Kumar Rathod.

== Career ==
She was a part of the Indian women's national kabaddi team that won gold in the Women's Kabaddi World Cup 2025 at Dhaka, Bangladesh in November 2025. She was adjudged as the Most Valuable Player of the tournament. After returning from the World Cup, Chhattisgarh Chief Minister Vishnu Deo Sai met her at his residence in Raipur and congratulated her. In 2025, she was also part of the Indian team that won the Asian Championship in Iran.
