= Muskan Malik (kabaddi) =

Indian kabaddi player

Personal information
- Nationality: Indian
- Born: 8 December 2000 (age 25)
Medal record
Women's Kabaddi
Representing India
Asian Games
Gold medal – first place	2022 Hangzhou	Team

Muskan Malik (ᱢᱩᱥᱠᱟᱱ ᱢᱚᱞᱤᱠ, born 8 December 2000) is an Indian kabaddi player. She was a part of the team that won the kabaddi gold medal at the 2022 Asian Games.
