= Roopnagar =

Village In Udaipur, Rajasthan

Coordinates: 25°16′59″N 73°38′0″E

Roopnagar is a village in the Udaipur section of Rajasthan. It is situated on the summit of the Aravallis, between the Desuri and Someshwar passes. Steep and precipitous hill-sides render the village unapproachable from the north and east. It is defended by outworks overlooking the plains and the Desuri pass on the west and south. Founded about 1772 by Thakur Veeramdeo, it is the principal seat of Solankis in Mewar, and is one of Greater 32 Nobles of Mewar court. The site was chosen solely for defence of the Pass of Desuri and Someshwar. There is no cultivation belonging to the town, nor is any revenue derived from it. Thakur of Roopnagar held the jagir of 84 villages on both sides of the Aravalli Range.

According to the 2011 census it has a population of 2288 living in 475 households. Its main agriculture product is makki growing.
