= Binita Pandit Chhetri =

Nepali kabaddi player

Personal information
- Native name: बिनिता पण्डित क्षेत्री
- Nationality: Nepali
- Born: Birendranagar, Surkhet District, Nepal
- Occupation: Kabaddi player

Sport
- Sport: Kabaddi
Medal record
Women's kabaddi
Representing Nepal
Asian Championship
Bronze medal – third place	2025 Tehran	Team competition
Asian Games
Bronze medal – third place	2026 Aichi-Nagoya	Team competition

Binita Pandit Chhetri (Nepali: बिनिता पण्डित क्षेत्री) is a Nepali kabaddi player who represents the Nepal women's national kabaddi team. She represented Nepal at the Asian Women's Kabaddi Championship, Kabaddi World Cup and Asian Games. She was part of Nepal's bronze-medal-winning team at the 2025 Asian Women's Kabaddi Championship and the 2026 Asian Games.

== Early life and career ==
Pandit Chhetri is from Birendranagar, Surkhet District, Nepal. She began playing kabaddi during grades 7 and 8 and progressed from school-level competitions to the national team.

Her progression to the national team made her one of the prominent women's kabaddi players from Karnali Province. She later became the first woman from Karnali to represent Nepal in kabaddi at the Asian Games.

== Kabaddi career ==
In March 2025, Pandit Chhetri was selected for Nepal's team at the 2025 Asian Women's Kabaddi Championship in Tehran, Iran. She was one of the players in the 10-member squad led by captain Manmati Bist. Nepal won the bronze medal at the championship after reaching the semifinals.

Pandit Chhetri was selected for Nepal's squad for the 2025 Women's Kabaddi World Cup in India. She was one of 14 players in the squad captained by Manmati Bist, with Jayanti Badu as vice-captain.

In 2026, Pandit Chhetri represented Nepal at the 2026 Asian Games in Aichi-Nagoya, Japan.
