= Jayanti Badu =

Nepali kabaddi player

Personal information
- Native name: जयन्ती बडु
- Nationality: Nepali
- Born: 23 February 2002 (age 24)
- Occupation: Kabaddi player

Sport
- Sport: Kabaddi
- Position: Defender
- Club: Armed Police Force Club
Medal record
Women's kabaddi
Representing Nepal
Asian Championship
Bronze medal – third place	2025 Tehran	Team competition
Asian Games
Bronze medal – third place	2022 Hangzhou	Team competition
South Asian Games
Silver medal – second place	2019 Kathmandu	Team competition

Jayanti Badu (Nepali: जयन्ती बडु; born 23 February 2002) is a Nepali kabaddi player who represents the Nepal women's national kabaddi team. She has represented Nepal at the South Asian Games, Asian Games, Asian Kabaddi Championship and the Kabaddi World Cup. She was a member of Nepal's bronze-medal-winning team at the 2022 Asian Games and won another bronze medal at the 2025 Asian Kabaddi Championship.

== Kabaddi career ==
Badu was selected for the Nepal women's kabaddi team for the 2019 South Asian Games in Kathmandu. She was part of the team that reached the final for the first time in the history of the women's kabaddi competition at the South Asian Games. Nepal won the silver medal after losing to India in the final.

Badu was selected for Nepal's women's kabaddi team for the 2022 Asian Games in Hangzhou, China, which were held in 2023 after being postponed. She was part of the team that won the bronze medal after reaching the semifinals.

Following the Asian Games, Badu played for Meghna Kabaddi Club in the women's kabaddi league in Dhaka, Bangladesh, alongside fellow Nepalese players Anuja Kulung Rai, Ganga Ghimire and Srijana Kumari Tharu.

In March 2025, Badu was part of the Nepal team that won the bronze medal at the Asian Women's Kabaddi Championship in Tehran, Iran. She was among the players who received a cash award from the Government of Nepal following the tournament.

In July 2025, Badu was appointed vice-captain of Nepal's women's team for the 2025 Women's Kabaddi World Cup in India. The squad included several members of the bronze-medal-winning 2022 Asian Games team.

Badu was also selected for Nepal's women's kabaddi team for the 2026 Asian Games in Aichi-Nagoya, Japan. She was one of six players from Nepal's bronze-medal-winning 2022 Asian Games team to return for the 2026 Games.

At the 20th Asian Games, Nepal again reached the semifinals of the women's kabaddi tournament and secured a bronze medal. Badu was part of the team led by captain Manmati Bist.

== Awards ==
Badu was named the best defender at the 20th National Women's Kabaddi Championship after helping the Armed Police Force Club win the tournament.

She was also nominated for the Sudurpaschim Sports Award's women's Sudurpaschim Icon category in 2021.
