= Rabina Chaudhary =

Nepali kabaddi player (born 2000)

Personal information
- Native name: रविना चौधरी
- Nationality: Nepali
- Born: 4 December 2000 (age 25) Kanchanpur District, Nepal
- Occupation: Kabaddi player

Sport
- Sport: Kabaddi
- Club: Armed Police Force Club
Medal record
Women's kabaddi
Representing Nepal
Asian Championship
Bronze medal – third place	2025 Tehran	Team competition
Asian Games
Bronze medal – third place	2022 Hangzhou	Team competition
Bronze medal – third place	2026 Aichi-Nagoya	Team competition
Asian Beach Games
Bronze medal – third place	2026 Sanya	Team competition
South Asian Games
Silver medal – second place	2019 Kathmandu	Team competition

Rabina Chaudhary (Nepali: रविना चौधरी; born 4 December 2000) is a Nepali kabaddi player who represents the Nepal women's national kabaddi team. She has represented Nepal at the South Asian Games, Asian Games, Asian Beach Games, Asian Women's Kabaddi Championship and the Kabaddi World Cup.

== Early life and career ==
Chaudhary was born in Kanchanpur District, Nepal. She began competing in kabaddi at the national level and was selected for Nepal's women's team for the 2019 South Asian Games in Kathmandu. She was part of the squad that reached the final of the women's kabaddi tournament, where Nepal won the silver medal after losing to India.

Chaudhary represented the Armed Police Force Club in domestic kabaddi competitions. In January 2025, she was promoted from constable to assistant head constable by the Armed Police Force Nepal in recognition of her sporting career.

== Kabaddi career ==
Chaudhary was selected for Nepal's women's kabaddi team for the 2022 Asian Games in Hangzhou, China, which were held in 2023 after being postponed. Nepal defeated Bangladesh in the group stage and advanced to the semifinals, where it lost to India. As a result, Nepal won the bronze medal. Chaudhary was one of the members of the team.

In 2025, Chaudhary was selected for Nepal's squad for the 2025 Women's Kabaddi World Cup in Hyderabad, India. She was among the 14 players selected for the tournament, with Manmati Bist as captain and Jayanti Badu as vice-captain.

In 2026, Chaudhary represented Nepal at the 2026 Asian Beach Games in Sanya, China. Nepal reached the semifinals of the women's beach kabaddi tournament and won the bronze medal. Chaudhary was part of the six-player Nepali team alongside Manmati Bist, Mina Nepali, Nanu Maya Parajuli, Srijana Kumari Tharu and Anuja Kulung Rai.

Chaudhary was also selected for Nepal's women's kabaddi team at the 2026 Asian Games in Aichi-Nagoya, Japan. Nepal defeated Sri Lanka in the group stage to secure a place in the semifinals and a bronze medal.

== Awards ==
Chaudhary was named the best player of the 21st Women's National Kabaddi Championship in January 2026 after the Armed Police Force Club won the title by defeating the Nepal Army in the final.
