= Ritu Sheoran =

Indian kabaddi player

Ritu Sheoran is an Indian kabaddi player from Haryana. She plays as a defender for the Indian women's national kabaddi team and for Haryana in the domestic tournaments.

She is from Kakdoli Hatti village, Charkhi Dadri district, Haryana. Her father is a farmer. She is employed with CISF in Panipat.

She was a part of the Indian women's national kabaddi team that won gold in the Women's Kabaddi World Cup 2025 at Bangladesh in November 2025.
