= Nepal women's national kabaddi team =

Nepali women's national kabaddi team

Nepal
- Association: All Nepal Kabaddi Association
- Confederation: Asian Kabaddi Federation
- Head Coach: Parbati Rai
- Captain: Manmati Bist

World Cup
- 2 (first in 2012)
- Group stage (2012, 2025)

Asian Games
- 2 (first in 2022)
- (bronze) 3rd (2022, 2026)
- (bronze) 3rd (2025)
Medal record
Event	1st	2nd	3rd
Asian Games	0	0	2
Asian Championship	0	0	1
Total	0	0	3
Asian Games
Bronze medal – third place	2022 Hangzhou	
Bronze medal – third place	2026 Aichi–Nagoya	
Asian Championship
Bronze medal – third place	2025 Iran	

The Nepal women's national kabaddi team represents Nepal in international women's kabaddi competitions. Governed by the All Nepal Kabaddi Association, the team has won a bronze medal at each of the last two Asian Games kabaddi tournaments, in 2022 (held in 2023) and 2026.

== History ==
Nepal's women played in the 2012 Women's Kabaddi World Cup, where they did not progress beyond the group stage.

At the 2022 Asian Games, held in Hangzhou in 2023, Nepal made its first appearance in women's kabaddi at the Asian Games and won a bronze medal. In Group B the team beat Bangladesh 37–24, lost 43–19 to Iran, and finished second in the group to reach the semi-finals, where it lost 61–17 to India.

In March 2025 Nepal took the bronze medal at the Asian Women's Kabaddi Championship in Tehran, where it lost 56–18 to India in the group stage. In November 2025 it played in the Women's Kabaddi World Cup in Dhaka, losing to Iran 39–11 in Group B, and did not reach the semi-finals.

At the 2026 Asian Games in Aichi–Nagoya, Nepal, captained by Manmati Bist and coached by Parbati Rai, opened with a 46–43 win over Thailand after trailing 24–15 at half-time, lost 37–18 to Chinese Taipei, and beat Sri Lanka 34–25 to finish second in Group B and reach the semi-finals, which guaranteed a medal. In the semi-final on 25 September Nepal lost 48–24 to India and took the bronze medal, shared with Chinese Taipei. It was Nepal's second medal of the Games.

== Tournament history ==
=== World Cup ===
Year	Rank
(India) 2012	Group stage
(Bangladesh) 2025	Group stage

=== Asian Games ===
Year	Rank	M	W	D	L	PF	PA	PD
(China) 2010	Did not enter							
(South Korea) 2014	Did not enter							
(Indonesia) 2018	Did not enter							
(China) 2022	Third place	3	1	0	2	73	128	-55
(Japan) 2026	Third place	4	2	0	2	122	153	-31
Total	2/5	7	3	0	4	195	281	-86

=== Asian Kabaddi Championship ===
Year	Rank
(Iran) 2025	Third place

== Results and fixtures ==
=== Recent results ===
Event	Dates	Venue	Result
Asian Games	21–26 September 2026	Aichi–Nagoya, Japan	Third place (lost semi-final to India 48–24)
Women's Kabaddi World Cup	17–24 November 2025	Dhaka, Bangladesh	Group stage
Asian Kabaddi Championship	6–8 March 2025	Tehran, Iran	Third place
Asian Games	2–7 October 2023	Xiaoshan, China	Third place (lost semi-final to India 61–17)

=== 2022 Asian Games results ===
Date	Round	Opponent	Score
2 October 2023	Group B	Bangladesh	37–24
3 October 2023	Group B	Iran	19–43
6 October 2023	Semi-final	India	17–61

=== 2026 Asian Games results ===
Date	Round	Opponent	Score
22 September 2026	Group B	Thailand	46–43
23 September 2026	Group B	Chinese Taipei	18–37
24 September 2026	Group B	Sri Lanka	34–25
25 September 2026	Semi-final	India	24–48

== Current squad ==
The following 12 players won the bronze medal at the 2026 Asian Games. Manmati Bist was the captain.

Name
Manmati Bist (captain)
Menuka Kumari Rajbanshi
Jayanti Badu
Rabina Chaudhary
Ganga Ghimire
Khim Maya Khatri
Mina Nepali
Srijana Kumari Tharu
Manisha Joshi
Binita Pandit Chhetri
Nanu Maya Parajuli
Asma Yadav

== Coaching staff ==
Position	Name
Head coach	(Nepal) Parbati Rai
