= Menuka Kumari Rajbanshi =

Nepali kabaddi player

Personal information
- Native name: मेनुका कुमारी राजवंशी
- Nationality: Nepali
- Born: 6 July 1994 (age 32) Jahada Rural Municipality, Morang District, Nepal
- Occupation: Kabaddi player

Sport
- Sport: Kabaddi
- Club: Nepal Army
Medal record
Women's kabaddi
Representing Nepal
Asian Games
Bronze medal – third place	2022 Hangzhou	Team competition
South Asian Games
Bronze medal – third place	2016 Guwahati-Shillong	Team competition
Silver medal – second place	2019 Kathmandu	Team competition

Menuka Kumari Rajbanshi (Nepali: मेनुका कुमारी राजवंशी; born 6 July 1994) is a Nepali kabaddi player and captain of the Nepal women's national kabaddi team. She has represented Nepal at the South Asian Games, Asian Games and the Kabaddi World Cup. She captained Nepal to a bronze medal at the 2022 Asian Games in Hangzhou, China.

== Early life and career ==
Rajbanshi was born in Jahada Rural Municipality, Morang District, Nepal. She became interested in sport while attending school and initially played kho kho. Her performances attracted the attention of kabaddi coach Bikulal Chaudhary, who encouraged her to take up kabaddi.

Rajbanshi joined the Nepal Army and continued her kabaddi career alongside her service. She represented Nepal at the 2016 South Asian Games in Guwahati, India, where the women's kabaddi team won the bronze medal. She was one of the younger members of the team during the tournament.

== Kabaddi career ==
Rajbanshi was part of the Nepal women's kabaddi team at the 2019 South Asian Games in Kathmandu, where Nepal reached the final and won the silver medal.

In 2023, Rajbanshi was named captain of Nepal's women's kabaddi team for the 2022 Asian Games in Hangzhou, which were held in 2023 after being postponed. She led the team during its first appearance in women's kabaddi at the Asian Games. Nepal defeated Bangladesh in the group stage and advanced to the semifinals, securing a bronze medal.

Rajbanshi was selected for Nepal's squad for the 2025 Women's Kabaddi World Cup, held in Hyderabad, India. She was part of the 14-player squad that travelled to India for training and the tournament.

In July 2026, Rajbanshi captained Nepal in a five-match women's kabaddi test series against Bangladesh. Nepal won the fifth match 25–21, with Rajbanshi named player of the match.

== Awards ==
Rajbanshi received the Nepal National and International Players Association Player of the Year Award for kabaddi in 2021.
