= Jyoti Thakur =

Indian kabaddi player

Personal information
- Nationality: Indian

Sport
- Sport: Kabaddi
Medal record
Women's Kabaddi
Representing India
Asian Games
Gold medal – first place	2022 Hangzhou	Women's team

Jyoti Thakur is an Indian kabaddi player. She was part of the team that won the women's kabaddi gold medal at the 2022 Asian Games.
