= Manmati Bist =

Nepali kabaddi player

Personal information
- Native name: मानमती विष्ट
- Nationality: Nepali
- Born: 9 September 1990 (age 36) Bhimdatta Municipality, Kanchanpur District, Nepal
- Occupation: Kabaddi player

Sport
- Sport: Kabaddi
- Position: Raider, defender
- Club: Nepal Police Club
Medal record
Women's kabaddi
Representing Nepal
Asian Games
Bronze medal – third place	2022 Hangzhou	Team competition
Bronze medal – third place	2026 Aichi-Nagoya	Team competition
Asian Beach Games
Bronze medal – third place	2026 Sanya	Team competition
South Asian Games
Silver medal – second place	2019 Kathmandu	Team competition

Manmati Bist (Nepali: मानमती विष्ट, born 9 September 1990) is a Nepali kabaddi player and captain of the Nepal women's national kabaddi team. She has represented Nepal at several international competitions and has won medals at the South Asian Games, Asian Games and Asian Beach Games.

== Early life and athletics ==
Bist was born and raised in Bhimdatta Municipality, Kanchanpur District, Nepal. Before taking up kabaddi, she competed in athletics, particularly middle-distance running. She won a gold medal in the 800 metres at the National Games and represented Nepal in athletics at the 2016 South Asian Games.

After an athletics event in which she was unable to compete in her intended event, Bist moved her focus to kabaddi. She joined the national kabaddi setup and became a regular member of the Nepal women's team.

== Kabaddi career ==
Bist made her international kabaddi debut in circle-style kabaddi and was part of Nepal's bronze-medal-winning team in a competition in Malaysia. She later played for an Indian club that won a circle kabaddi league.

At the 2019 South Asian Games, Bist was part of the Nepal women's kabaddi team that won the silver medal. In the semifinal against Sri Lanka, she scored decisive points late in the match to help Nepal secure a place in the final.

Bist was a key member of the Nepal women's kabaddi team at the 2022 Asian Games in Hangzhou, where Nepal won the bronze medal. She played both as a raider and defender during the tournament.

She subsequently became captain of the national team. In 2025, she captained Nepal at the 2025 Women's Kabaddi World Cup in India.

In 2026, Bist captained Nepal at the 2026 Asian Beach Games in Sanya, China. Nepal reached the semifinals and won the bronze medal.

At the 2026 Asian Games in Aichi-Nagoya, Bist again captained Nepal's women's kabaddi team. Nepal reached the semifinals and secured its second consecutive Asian Games bronze medal. In the quarterfinal against Sri Lanka, Bist scored the decisive final raid that helped Nepal advance to the semifinals.

Bist also carried the Nepali flag during the opening ceremony of the 2026 Asian Games.

== Awards ==
Bist was nominated for the People's Choice Award at the NSJF Pulsar Sports Award following Nepal's bronze-medal performance at the 2022 Asian Games.

== See also ==
- Nepal women's national kabaddi team
- Nepal at the Asian Games
