= India women's national kabaddi team =

Indian women's kabaddi team

India
- Association: Amateur Kabaddi Federation of India
- Confederation: Asian Kabaddi Federation
- Head Coach: V. Tejeswini Bai; Kavitha Selvaraj
- Captain: Ritu Negi

World Cup
- 2 (first in 2012)
- (gold) 1st (2012, 2025)

Asian Games
- 5 (first in 2010)
- (gold) 1st (2010, 2014, 2022, 2026)

Asian Championship
- 5 (first in 2005)
- (gold) 1st (2005, 2007, 2008, 2017, 2025)
Medal record
Event	1st	2nd	3rd
World Cup	2	0	0
Kabaddi World Cup	2	0	0
Circle World Cup	3	0	0
Asian Games	4	1	0
Asian Championship	5	0	0
Asian Indoor Games	1	0	0
Asian Beach Games	6	0	0
South Asian Beach Games	1	0	0
Commonwealth Championship	1	0	0
South Asian Games	4	0	0
Total	29	1	0
World Cup
Gold medal – first place	2012 India	
Gold medal – first place	2025 Bangladesh	
Kabaddi World Cup
Gold medal – first place	2019 Malaysia	
Gold medal – first place	2025 England	
Circle World Cup
Gold medal – first place	2013 India	
Gold medal – first place	2014 India	
Gold medal – first place	2016 India	
Asian Games
Gold medal – first place	2010 Guangzhou	
Gold medal – first place	2014 Incheon	
Gold medal – first place	2022 Hangzhou	
Gold medal – first place	2026 Aichi–Nagoya	
Silver medal – second place	2018 Jakarta	
Asian Championship
Gold medal – first place	2005 India	
Gold medal – first place	2007 Iran	
Gold medal – first place	2008 India	
Gold medal – first place	2017 Iran	
Gold medal – first place	2025 Iran	
Asian Indoor Games
Gold medal – first place	2013 Incheon	
Asian Beach Games
Gold medal – first place	2008 Bali	
Gold medal – first place	2010 Muscat	
Gold medal – first place	2012 Haiyang	
Gold medal – first place	2014 Phuket	
Gold medal – first place	2016 Danang	
Gold medal – first place	2026 Sanya	
South Asian Beach Games
Gold medal – first place	2011 Sri Lanka	
Commonwealth Championship
Gold medal – first place	2026 Ahmedabad	
South Asian Games
Gold medal – first place	2006 Colombo	
Gold medal – first place	2010 Dhaka	
Gold medal – first place	2016 Guwahati	
Gold medal – first place	2019 Kathmandu–Pokhara	

The India women's national kabaddi team represents India in international women's kabaddi competitions. Governed by the Amateur Kabaddi Federation of India (AKFI), the team has won gold medals at the Asian Games in four of the five editions in which women's kabaddi has been contested (2010, 2014, 2022 and 2026), finishing runners-up in 2018. In the 2026 final India beat Iran 37–34 to retain the title.

India has won the Women's Kabaddi World Cup (standard style) in 2012 and 2025, defeating Chinese Taipei 35–28 in the 2025 final, and the circle-style World Cup in 2013, 2014 and 2016. The team has also won the Asian Kabaddi Championship five times (2005, 2007, 2008, 2017 and 2025) and the South Asian Games four times (2006, 2010, 2016 and 2019). At the Asian Beach Games, women's teams have won gold in 2008, 2010, 2012, 2014, 2016 and 2026. The women's team also won the inaugural Commonwealth Kabaddi Championship in 2026, beating Uganda 35–15 in the final, and the Kabaddi World Cup organised by World Kabaddi in 2019 and 2025.

== History ==
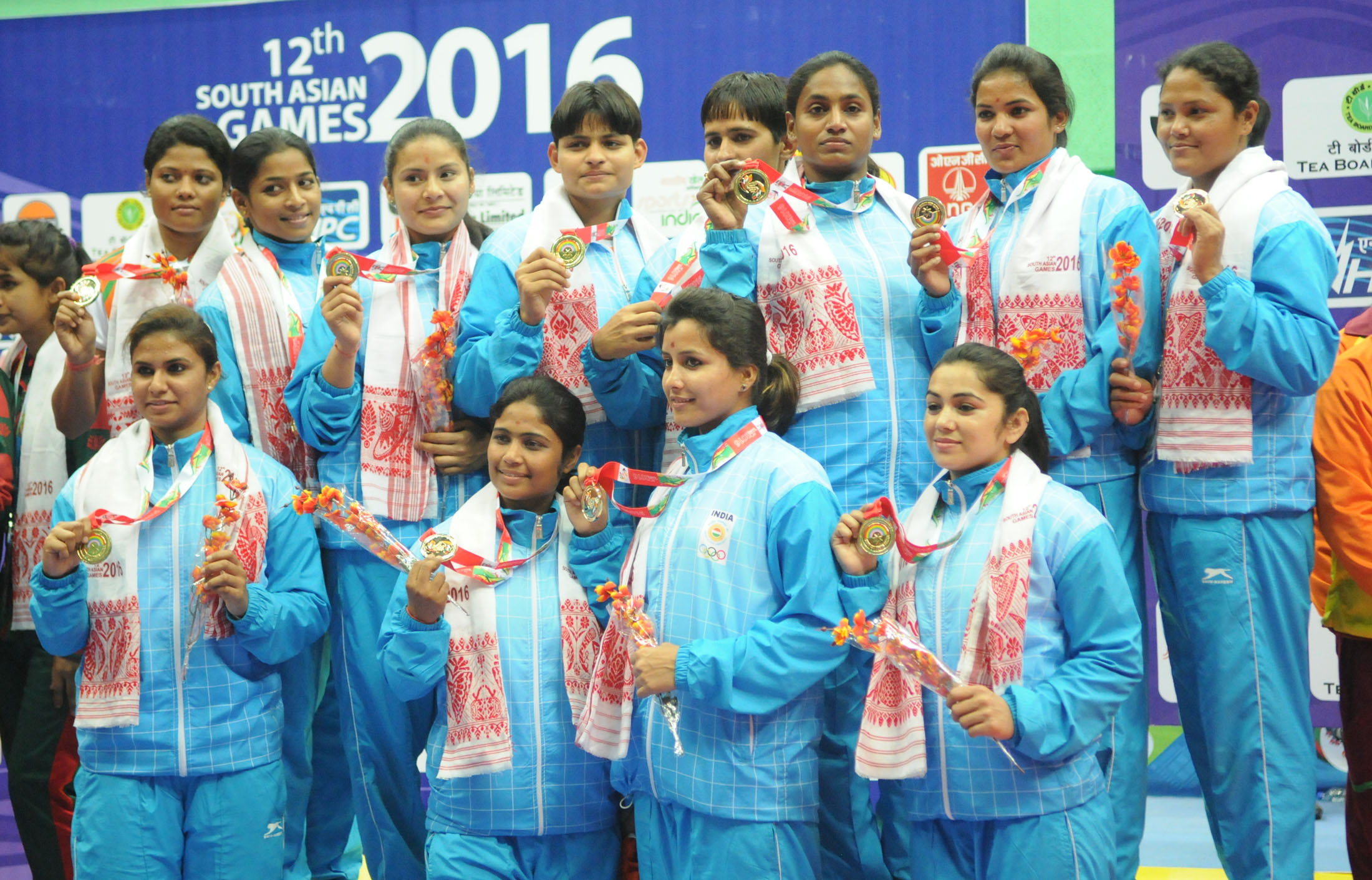
The India women's national kabaddi team after winning gold at the 2016 South Asian Games

=== Origins and early development ===
Kabaddi is a contact sport from the Indian subcontinent and one of India's most popular sports, particularly in rural areas. The All India Kabaddi Federation was formed in 1950 and developed uniform rules for the sport; in 1972 it was replaced by the Amateur Kabaddi Federation of India (AKFI), which restructured the regulations and organises the national championships from which the national teams are selected.

=== Rise to dominance (2000s–2010s) ===
India's women won the Asian Kabaddi Championship in 2005, 2007 and 2008, and gold at the 2006 South Asian Games and 2010 South Asian Games. Women's kabaddi made its debut at the 2010 Asian Games in Guangzhou, where India won gold, and the team also won gold at the Asian Beach Games in 2008 and 2010.

India won the inaugural Women's Kabaddi World Cup in 2012, and retained the title in the circle-style World Cup in 2013, 2014 and 2016. The team won the 2014 Asian Games gold in Incheon, the beach kabaddi gold at the Asian Beach Games in 2012, 2014 and 2016, the 2016 South Asian Games in Guwahati, and the 2017 Asian Kabaddi Championship.

=== Modern era (2018–present) ===
At the 2018 Asian Games in Jakarta, India's women lost the final and took silver, ending a run of gold medals at the Asian Games. In July 2019 they won the inaugural Kabaddi World Cup organised by World Kabaddi in Melaka, Malaysia, beating Chinese Taipei 47–29 in the final, and followed it with gold at the 2019 South Asian Games in Kathmandu. They then reclaimed the Asian Games title at the 2022 Asian Games in Hangzhou.

In March 2025 the team won the Asian Kabaddi Championship in Tehran, winning all five of its matches and scoring 301 points while conceding 106, including a 32–25 win over Iran. In November 2025 India won the Women's Kabaddi World Cup at the Shaheed Suhrawardi Indoor Stadium in Dhaka, winning all six matches, beating Iran 33–21 in the semi-final and Chinese Taipei 35–28 in the final; Sanju Devi was named most valuable player. In March 2025 the women's team also won the Kabaddi World Cup organised by World Kabaddi in Wolverhampton, England, a tournament not sanctioned by the IKF, beating England 57–34 in the final.

In April 2026 the women's team won gold in beach kabaddi at the 2026 Asian Beach Games in Sanya, while the men's team took silver. At the 2026 Asian Games in Aichi–Nagoya the team went unbeaten, winning its group matches against Bangladesh (42–21), Iran (37–23) and Japan (50–25), then beating Nepal 48–24 in the semi-final to reach a fifth consecutive Asian Games final. In the final on 26 September at the Tokai Citizens Gymnasium, India defeated Iran 37–34 to retain the title and claim a fourth Asian Games gold, with Sanju Devi among the leading performers.

In October 2026 a squad captained by Nidhi Sharma won the inaugural Commonwealth Kabaddi Championship in Ahmedabad, finishing unbeaten. India beat Uganda 41–18 and Nigeria 38–10 in the group stage, beat Sri Lanka in the semi-final and defeated Uganda 35–15 in the final on 31 October.

== Governing body ==
The Amateur Kabaddi Federation of India (AKFI) is the apex national governing body for kabaddi in India. It is affiliated with the Indian Olympic Association, the Asian Kabaddi Federation and the International Kabaddi Federation (IKF), and conducts the Senior National Kabaddi Championship used for talent scouting and selection of the national teams. In 2024 the IKF suspended the AKFI over governance disputes, barring Indian kabaddi teams from international competition until the suspension was lifted in 2025.

== Tournament history ==
=== Standard kabaddi ===
==== World Cup ====
The Women's Kabaddi World Cup, organised by the International Kabaddi Federation, has been won by India on both editions in which it has been contested to date (2012 and 2025). In the 2025 edition India won all six matches, scoring 289 points and conceding 125.

Women's Kabaddi World Cup
Year	Host country	Position
2012	India	(gold) 1st
2025	Bangladesh	(gold) 1st

==== Asian Games ====
Women's kabaddi was introduced at the Asian Games in 2010. India has won gold in four of five editions, with silver in 2018 when Iran won the final. In 2026 India beat Iran 37–34 in the final at the Tokai Citizens Gymnasium to retain the title.

Asian Games
Year	Host city	Position
2010	Guangzhou, China	(gold) 1st
2014	Incheon, South Korea	(gold) 1st
2018	Jakarta, Indonesia	(silver) 2nd
2022	Hangzhou, China	(gold) 1st
2026	Aichi–Nagoya, Japan	(gold) 1st

==== Asian Kabaddi Championship ====
The Asian Kabaddi Championship, organised by the Asian Kabaddi Federation, is the continental championship for senior national teams. India's women have won five titles; they did not participate in the 2016 edition.

Asian Kabaddi Championship
Year	Host country	Position
2005	India	(gold) 1st
2007	Iran	(gold) 1st
2008	India	(gold) 1st
2016	South Korea	Did not participate
2017	Iran	(gold) 1st
2025	Tehran, Iran	(gold) 1st

==== Commonwealth Kabaddi Championship ====
The inaugural Commonwealth Kabaddi Championship was held at the Veer Savarkar Sports Complex in Ahmedabad from 23 to 31 October 2026, with 10 women's teams competing. India, captained by Nidhi Sharma, won the title unbeaten, beating Uganda 35–15 in the final.

Commonwealth Kabaddi Championship
Year	Host city	Position
2026	Ahmedabad, India	(gold) 1st

==== South Asian Games ====
The women's team has won gold at all four editions of the South Asian Games in which women's kabaddi was contested.

South Asian Games
Year	Host city	Position
2006	Colombo, Sri Lanka	(gold) 1st
2010	Dhaka, Bangladesh	(gold) 1st
2016	Guwahati & Shillong, India	(gold) 1st
2019	Kathmandu, Pokhara & Janakpur, Nepal	(gold) 1st

=== World kabaddi ===
==== World Cup ====
The Kabaddi World Cup is organised by World Kabaddi and is separate from the IKF's World Cup. India won both editions held to date: in 2019 in Melaka, Malaysia (final: beat Chinese Taipei 47–29), and in 2025 in England (final: beat England 57–34).

Year	Rank	Final
(Malaysia) 2019	Champions	Beat Chinese Taipei 47–29
(England) 2025	Champions	Beat England 57–34

=== Beach kabaddi ===
==== Asian Beach Games ====
Asian Beach Games
Year	Host city	Position
2008	Bali, Indonesia	(gold) 1st
2010	Muscat, Oman	(gold) 1st
2012	Haiyang, China	(gold) 1st
2014	Phuket, Thailand	(gold) 1st
2016	Danang, Vietnam	(gold) 1st
2026	Sanya, China	(gold) 1st

==== South Asian Beach Games ====
Year	Rank
(Sri Lanka) 2011	Champions

=== Indoor kabaddi ===
==== Asian Indoor and Martial Arts Games ====
Year	Rank	Pld	W	D	L
(South Korea) 2013	Champions	5	5	0	0
(South Korea) 2013	Participated as (International Olympic Committee) Independent Olympic Athletes (IOA)				
Total	1/1	5	5	0	0

=== Circle kabaddi ===
==== Circle World Cup ====
Year	Rank
(India) 2013	Champions
(India) 2014	Champions
(India) 2016	Champions

== Recent results and fixtures ==
=== Recent results ===
Event	Dates	Venue	Result
Commonwealth Kabaddi Championship	23–31 October 2026	Ahmedabad, India	Champions (beat Uganda 35–15 in final)
Asian Games	September 2026	Aichi–Nagoya, Japan	Champions (beat Iran 37–34 in final)
Asian Beach Games	April 2026	Sanya, China	Champions
Women's Kabaddi World Cup	17–24 November 2025	Dhaka, Bangladesh	Champions (beat Chinese Taipei 35–28 in final)
Asian Kabaddi Championship	6–8 March 2025	Tehran, Iran	Champions (won all five matches)

=== 2025 match results ===
Competition	Date	Round	Opponent	Score	Venue
Asian Championship	6 March 2025	—	Bangladesh	64–23	Tehran
Asian Championship	6 March 2025	—	Thailand	76–21	Tehran
Asian Championship	7 March 2025	—	Malaysia	73–19	Tehran
Asian Championship	7 March 2025	—	Nepal	56–18	Tehran
Asian Championship	8 March 2025	—	Iran	32–25	Tehran
World Cup	18 November 2025	Group stage	Thailand	64–20	Dhaka
World Cup	19 November 2025	Group stage	Bangladesh	43–18	Dhaka
World Cup	20 November 2025	Group stage	Germany	63–22	Dhaka
World Cup	21 November 2025	Group stage	Uganda	51–16	Dhaka
World Cup	23 November 2025	Semi-final	Iran	33–21	Dhaka
World Cup	24 November 2025	Final	Chinese Taipei	35–28	Dhaka

=== 2026 match results ===
Competition	Date	Round	Opponent	Score	Venue
Asian Games	—	Group stage	Bangladesh	42–21	Aichi–Nagoya
Asian Games	—	Group stage	Iran	37–23	Aichi–Nagoya
Asian Games	—	Group stage	Japan	50–25	Aichi–Nagoya
Asian Games	25 September 2026	Semi-final	Nepal	48–24	Tokai Citizens Gymnasium
Asian Games	26 September 2026	Final	Iran	37–34	Tokai Citizens Gymnasium
Commonwealth Championship	—	Group stage	Uganda	41–18	Ahmedabad
Commonwealth Championship	—	Group stage	Nigeria	38–10	Ahmedabad
Commonwealth Championship	30 October 2026	Semi-final	Sri Lanka	Won	Ahmedabad
Commonwealth Championship	31 October 2026	Final	Uganda	35–15	Ahmedabad

== Current squad ==
The following 12-member squad, captained by Pushpa Rana, won gold at the 2026 Asian Games.

Player	Role
Pushpa Rana (Captain)	All-rounder
Ritu Negi	
Sonali Shingate	
Sanju Devi	
Pooja Kajla	
Ritu Sheoran	All-rounder
Jyoti Thakur	
Pinki Roy	Left cover
Manisha Kumari	Left corner
Bhavna Thakur	Right cover
Raj Rani	
Nikita Kumari	

For the 2026 Commonwealth Kabaddi Championship, India named a separate 14-member squad led by Nidhi Sharma (captain) and Ritu (vice-captain), which won the title unbeaten.

== Coaching staff ==
The coaching staff is appointed by the AKFI for national coaching camps and international competitions. For the 2026 Asian Games, the AKFI named Neeta Dadwe, a former India captain who had previously coached the national team at the 2014 and 2016 Asian Games, as head coach, with Mamtha Poojari as assistant coach.

Position	Name
Head coach	(India) Neeta Dadwe
Assistant coach	(India) Mamtha Poojari

For the 2025 Asian Women's Kabaddi Championship in Tehran, the staff was V. Tejeswini Bai (chief coach), Kavitha Selvaraj (assistant coach) and Banani Saha (manager).

== Training facilities ==
Senior national coaching camps are held at the Sports Authority of India National Centre of Excellence in Gandhinagar, Gujarat, which is designated for kabaddi. A senior women's national coaching camp was held there from 27 October to 13 November 2025.

== Honours ==
=== World ===
- World Cup – Standard style:
  - Champions (2): 2012, 2025
- Kabaddi World Cup (World Kabaddi):
  - Champions (2): 2019, 2025
- World Cup – Circle style:
  - Champions (3): 2013, 2014, 2016

=== Asia ===
- Asian Kabaddi Championship:
  - Champions (5): 2005, 2007, 2008, 2017, 2025
- Asian Games:
  - Gold Medal (4): 2010, 2014, 2022, 2026
  - Silver Medal (1): 2018
- Asian Indoor Games:
  - Gold Medal (1): 2013
- Asian Beach Games:
  - Gold Medal (6): 2008, 2010, 2012, 2014, 2016, 2026

=== Commonwealth ===
- Commonwealth Kabaddi Championship:
  - Champions (1): 2026

=== South Asia ===
- South Asian Games:
  - Gold Medal (4): 2006, 2010, 2016, 2019
- South Asian Beach Games:
  - Gold Medal (1): 2011

== Players ==
=== Captains ===
Ritu Negi captained the squad at the 2025 Women's Kabaddi World Cup in Dhaka, with Pushpa Rana as vice-captain, and India beat Chinese Taipei 35–28 in the final; Sanju Devi was named most valuable player of the tournament. For the 2026 Asian Games the selectors named Pushpa Rana, a player from Himachal Pradesh who had previously served as vice-captain, as captain in her first captaincy assignment; Ritu Negi and Sonali Shingate were the senior players in the 12-member squad, which won gold by beating Iran 37–34 in the final. A separate squad captained by Nidhi Sharma won the 2026 Commonwealth Kabaddi Championship.

=== Recent stars ===
- Pushpa Rana – An all-rounder from Himachal Pradesh, she was in the squad that won gold at the 2022 Asian Games, vice-captain at the 2025 Women's Kabaddi World Cup, and captain of the 2026 Asian Games gold-medal team.
- Ritu Negi – A defender from Uttarakhand who captained India to the 2025 Women's Kabaddi World Cup title and remained a senior member of the 2026 Asian Games squad.
- Sanju Devi – Named most valuable player of the 2025 Women's Kabaddi World Cup, and among India's leading performers in the 2026 Asian Games final.
- Sonali Vishnu Shingate – An all-rounder from Maharashtra, a member of the 2025 World Cup squad and one of the senior players of the 2026 Asian Games team.

== See also ==
- India men's national kabaddi team
- Kabaddi in India
- Pro Kabaddi League
- Women's Kabaddi Challenge
- Kabaddi at the Asian Games
- World Kabaddi League
- Kho kho
