= Ganga Ghimire =

Nepali kabaddi player (born 1998)

Personal information
- Native name: गंगा घिमिरे
- Nationality: Nepali
- Born: 25 January 1998 (age 28)
- Occupation: Kabaddi player

Sport
- Sport: Kabaddi
- Club: Nepal Army
Medal record
Women's kabaddi
Representing Nepal
Asian Championship
Bronze medal – third place	2025 Tehran	Team competition
Asian Games
Bronze medal – third place	2022 Hangzhou	Team competition
Bronze medal – third place	2026 Aichi-Nagoya	Team competition

Ganga Ghimire (Nepali: गंगा घिमिरे; born 25 January 1998) is a Nepali kabaddi player who represents the Nepal women's national kabaddi team. She has represented Nepal at international competitions including the Asian Games, Asian Women's Kabaddi Championship and the Kabaddi World Cup. She is a member of the Nepal Army and has won bronze medals at the 2022 Asian Games, 2025 Asian Women's Kabaddi Championship and 2026 Asian Games.

== Kabaddi career ==
Ghimire was selected for Nepal's women's kabaddi team for the 2022 Asian Games in Hangzhou, China, which were held in 2023 after being postponed. She was one of 12 players selected for the tournament and represented the Nepal Army.

Nepal defeated Bangladesh 37–24 in its opening group match before losing to Iran 43–19. The team advanced to the semifinals, where it lost to India 61–17, securing the bronze medal. Ghimire was part of the Nepali team throughout the tournament.

Ghimire was also a member of Nepal's team at the 2025 Asian Women's Kabaddi Championship in Tehran, Iran. Nepal won the bronze medal in the tournament, with Ghimire among the players selected for the competition.

In July 2025, Ghimire was selected for Nepal's squad for the 2025 Women's Kabaddi World Cup in India. She was one of 14 players selected for the tournament, with Manmati Bist as captain and Jayanti Badu as vice-captain.

In 2026, Ghimire was selected again for Nepal's women's kabaddi team at the 2026 Asian Games in Aichi-Nagoya, Japan. She was one of six players in the squad who had also won bronze at the 2022 Asian Games.
