= Kabaddi at the 2022 Asian Games – Women's tournament =

Women at the 2022 Asian Games
- Venue: Xiaoshan Guali Sports Centre
- Date: 2–7 October 2023
- Competitors: 83 from 7 nations

Medalists
gold medal	India
silver medal	Chinese Taipei
bronze medal	Nepal
bronze medal	Iran

Women's Kabaddi at the 2022 Asian Games was held at Guali Sports Centre, Xiaoshan District, China from 2 to 7 October 2023.

== Squads ==
Bangladesh	Chinese Taipei	India	Iran
Laky Akhter; Tahrim; Rekha Akhteri; Meybi Chakma; Most Srity Akhter; Nabarshi Chakma; Brishti Biswas; Sriti Akhter; Anzuara Ratry; Hafiza Akther; Rupali Akhter; Loba Akhter	Lin I-min; Chuang Ya-han; Hu Yu-chen; Huang Ssu-chin; Yen Chiao-wen; Ren Ming-xiu; Kang Yung-chiao; Feng Hsiu-chen; Qin Pei-jyun; Huang Yi-yun; Liu Yi-ju; Wu Yu-jung	Sushma Sharma; Sakshi Kumari; Pushpa Rana; Nidhi Sharma; Muskan Malik; Priyanka Pilaniya; Ritu Negi; Pooja Hathwala; Pooja Narwal; Jyoti Thakur; Akshima Singh; Snehal Shinde	Ghazal Khalaj; Mahboubeh Sanchouli; Zahra Karimi; Saeideh Jafari; Sedigheh Jafari; Roya Davoudian; Farideh Zarifdoust; Mohaddeseh Rajabloo; Fatemeh Khodabandehloo; Fatemeh Mansouri; Maryam Solgi; Raheleh Naderi
Nepal	South Korea	Thailand	
Manmati Bist; itu Gurung; Menuka Kumari Rajbanshi; Jayanti Badu; Isha Rai; Arpana Chaudhary; Srijana Kumari Tharu; Sunita Thapa; Rabina Chaudhary; Kalawati Pant; Anuja Kulung Rai; Ganga Ghimire	Lee Hyun-jeong; Moon Kyung-seo; Woo Hee-jun; Kim Hee-jeong; Park Ji-yi; Lee Seul-ji; Yoon Yu-ri; Kim Ji-young; Choi Da-hye; An Myeong-eun; Jo Hyun-a	Namfon Kangkeeree; Wassana Rachmanee; Latdawan Saelim; Kamontip Tippichaikul; Bencharat Khwanchai; Saowapa Chueakhao; Atchara Puangngern; Kanitta Noosong; Panthida Khamthat; Treepet Kliadsoo; Wanita Mayer; Naleerat Ketsaro	

== Results ==
All times are China Standard Time (UTC+08:00)

=== Preliminary round ===
==== Group A ====
Pos	Team	Pld	W	D	L	PF	PA	PD	Pts	Qualification
1	India	3	2	1	0	144	79	+65	5 (Note: Match points difference against the teams which scored 25% or more of the league points: IND +32, TPE +9.)	Semifinals
2	Chinese Taipei	3	2	1	0	106	86	+20	5	Semifinals
3	Thailand	3	1	0	2	93	114	−21	2	
4	South Korea	3	0	0	3	70	134	−64	0	

Source: Official website
Notes:

2 October
16:20

India	34–34 (HT: 17–15)	Chinese Taipei

Xiaoshan Guali Sports Centre, Hangzhou

2 October
17:30

Thailand	43–23 (HT: 17–10)	South Korea

Xiaoshan Guali Sports Centre, Hangzhou

3 October
16:10

South Korea	23–56 (HT: 9–32)	India

Xiaoshan Guali Sports Centre, Hangzhou

3 October
17:20

Chinese Taipei	37–28 (HT: 20–8)	Thailand

Xiaoshan Guali Sports Centre, Hangzhou

4 October
16:15

India	54–22 (HT: 32–9)	Thailand

Xiaoshan Guali Sports Centre, Hangzhou

4 October
17:10

South Korea	24–35 (HT: 10–18)	Chinese Taipei

Xiaoshan Guali Sports Centre, Hangzhou

==== Group B ====
Pos	Team	Pld	W	D	L	PF	PA	PD	Pts	Qualification
1	Iran	2	2	0	0	97	35	+62	4	Semifinals
2	Nepal	2	1	0	1	56	67	−11	2	Semifinals
3	Bangladesh	2	0	0	2	40	91	−51	0	

Source: Official website

2 October
10:30

Bangladesh	24–37 (HT: 16–21)	Nepal

Xiaoshan Guali Sports Centre, Hangzhou

3 October
11:00

Nepal	19–43 (HT: 11–19)	Iran

Xiaoshan Guali Sports Centre, Hangzhou

4 October
10:45

Iran	54–16 (HT: 28–5)	Bangladesh

Xiaoshan Guali Sports Centre, Hangzhou

=== Knockout round ===
Semifinals
6 October
India	61
Nepal	17
6 October
Iran	24
Chinese Taipei	35

Gold medal match
7 October
India	26
Chinese Taipei	25

==== Semifinals ====
6 October
9:30

India	61–17 (HT: 29–10)	Nepal

Xiaoshan Guali Sports Centre, Hangzhou

6 October
10:20

Iran	24–35 (HT: 10–18)	Chinese Taipei

Xiaoshan Guali Sports Centre, Hangzhou

==== Gold medal match ====
7 October
9:30

India	26–25 (HT: 14–9)	Chinese Taipei

Xiaoshan Guali Sports Centre, Hangzhou

== Final standing ==
Rank	Team	Pld	W	D	L
1st place, gold medalist(s)	India	5	4	1	0
2nd place, silver medalist(s)	Chinese Taipei	5	3	1	1
3rd place, bronze medalist(s)	Iran	3	2	0	1
3rd place, bronze medalist(s)	Nepal	3	1	0	2
5	Bangladesh	2	0	0	2
5	Thailand	3	1	0	2
7	South Korea	3	0	0	3
