= Kabaddi World Cup =

Kabaddi World Cup may refer to:

- Kabaddi World Cup (International Kabaddi Federation), an international competition organised by International Kabaddi Federation
- Kabaddi World Cup (World Kabaddi), an international competition organised by World Kabaddi
- Kabaddi World Cup (circle style), an international competition in circle style (a.k.a. Punjabi) kabaddi organised by various bodies

== See also ==
- Junior Kabaddi World Cup, an international competition organised by International Kabaddi Federation
