= Asia Kabaddi Cup (circle style) =

Regional Kabaddi competition

- Sport: Circle style kabaddi
- Founded: 2011
- Region: Asia
- Most recent champion: Pakistan
- Most titles: Pakistan (2 titles)
- Broadcaster: PTV Sports
- Related competitions: Kabaddi World Cup (circle style)

The circle style Asia Kabaddi Cup, is a regional kabaddi competition administered by the Pakistan Kabaddi Federation contested by national teams within the continent of Asia. The competition has been contested in 2011, 2012 and 2016.

The current format of the competition involves a round robin.

== Summary ==
Year	Host	Gold	Silver	Bronze	Ref
2011	(Iran); Tabriz	India	Pakistan	Iran	
2012	(Pakistan); Lahore	Pakistan	India	Iran	
2016	(Pakistan); Wah Cantonment	Pakistan	India	Iran	

== Medal table ==
Rank	Nation	Gold	Silver	Bronze	Total
1	Pakistan	2	1	0	3
2	India	1	2	0	3
3	Iran	0	0	3	3
4	Afghanistan	0	0	0	0
4	Nepal	0	0	0	0
4	South Korea	0	0	0	0
4	Sri Lanka	0	0	0	0
4	Turkmenistan	0	0	0	0
Totals (8 entries)		3	3	3	9

== See also ==
- Kabaddi Asia Cup
- 2020 Kabaddi World Cup (Circle style)
