= India–Pakistan sports rivalries =

India and Pakistan are frequent rivals across a variety of sports, with matches between the two countries considered to be some of the most intense in the world, especially in cricket. The tense relations between the two nations which emerged from bitter diplomatic relationships and conflict that originated during the Partition of British India into India and Pakistan in 1947, the India–Pakistan wars, and the Kashmir conflict established the foundations for the emergence of an intense sporting rivalry between the two nations.

== Olympics ==
India and Pakistan first participated at the 1900 and 1948 Olympic Games respectively. India has outranked Pakistan in all editions of the Olympic Games, except on seven occasions (1960, 1968, 1972, 1984, 1988, 1992 and 2024), when Pakistan finished higher in the medal tally.

As of 2024 Paris Olympic Games

	**India**	**Pakistan**
Medal Ranking	58th	78th
**Gold**	**10**	4
**Silver**	**10**	3
**Bronze**	**21**	4
Total	41	11

- **Bold** indicates most wins

== Asian Games ==
India and Pakistan first participated in the 1951 and 1954 Asian Games respectively.

India hosted 1951 and 1982 Asian Games.

As of 2022 Asian Games

	**India**	**Pakistan**
Medal Ranking	5th	18th
**Gold**	**183**	44
**Silver**	**239**	64
**Bronze**	**357**	99
Total	779	207

- **Bold** indicates most wins

== Commonwealth Games ==
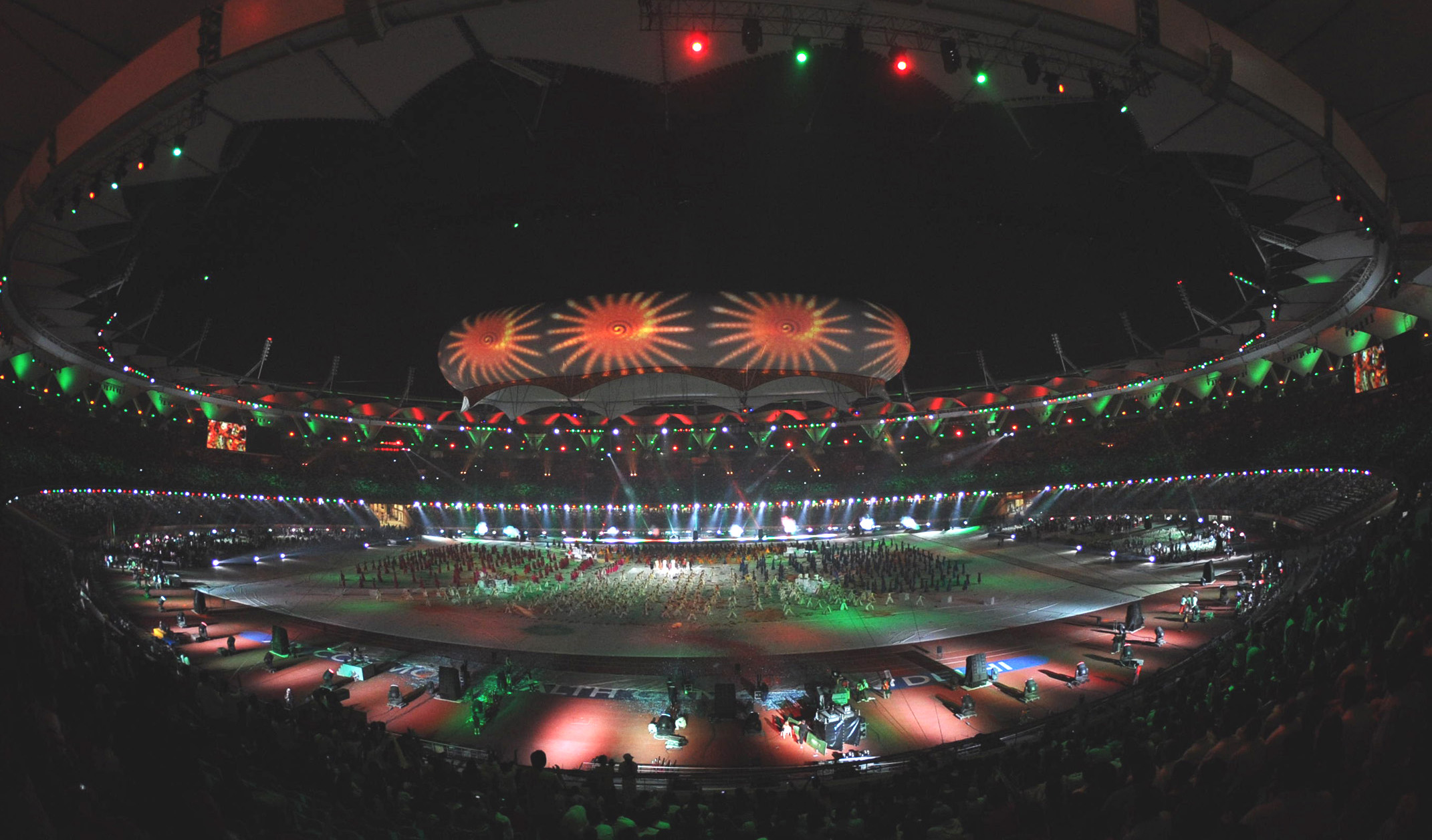
Closing ceremony of the 2010 Commonwealth Games, Delhi, India

The Commonwealth Games, often referred to as the Friendly Games, are a quadrennial international multi-sport event among athletes from the Commonwealth of Nations. India and Pakistan participated their first commonwealth games in 1934 and 1954 respectively.

India hosted the 2010 Commonwealth Games in New Delhi.

As of 2026 Commonwealth Games

	**India**	**Pakistan**
Medal Ranking	4th	15th
**Gold**	**215**	27
**Silver**	**207**	27
**Bronze**	**180**	29
Total	602	83

- **Bold** indicates most wins

== South Asian Games ==
India and Pakistan participated all the editions of South Asian Games. India hosted the multi-sport event 3 times (1987, 1995, 2016) and Pakistan also hosted this event 3 times (1989, 2004, 2025).

As of 2019 South Asian Games

	**India**	**Pakistan**
Medal Ranking	1st	2nd
**Gold**	**1263**	297
**Silver**	**736**	421
**Bronze**	379	**432**
Total	2378	1150

- **Bold** indicates most wins

== Association football ==
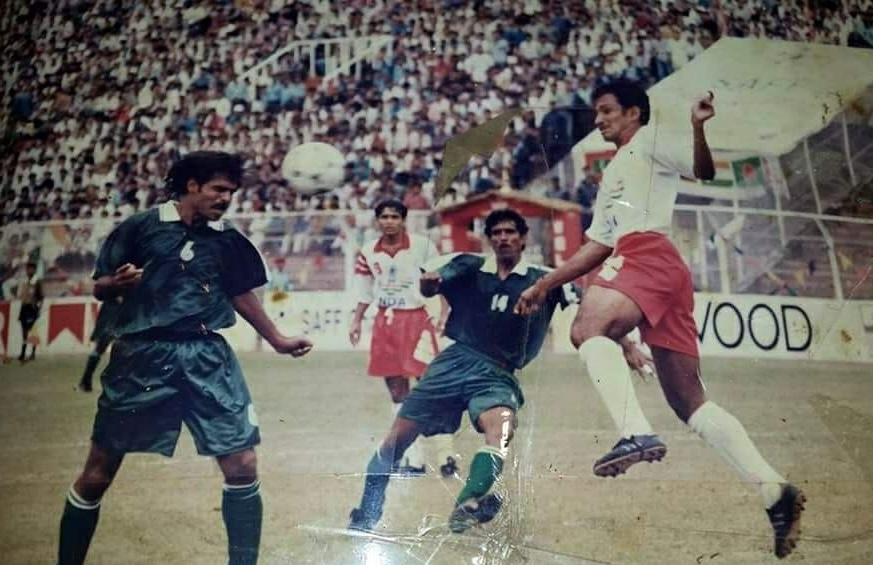
Pakistan against India at the 1997 SAFF Gold Cup

Pakistan and India national football teams rivalry often attract sizeable crowds. The two teams first met at the 1952 Colombo Cup, which ended in a goalless draw and both teams crowned champions of the tournament. India first won at the consequent 1953 Colombo Cup with a 1–0 win, with Neville D'Souza scoring a goal. Pakistan men’s football team recorded its first official win over India at the 1960 AFC Asian Cup qualification in 1959, with Abdullah Rahi netting the winner. In addition, both teams have faced each other two times in unofficial exhibition matches after the finalisation of the 1953 and 1955 Colombo Cup editions, with Pakistan winning both times by 1–0.

=== Summary of Overall Results ===
==== Men's matches ====
As of 17 November 2026 (Note: Exclude the two unofficial exhibition matches after the finalisation of the 1953 and 1955 Colombo Cup editions, with Pakistan winning both times by 1–0. Match at the Afghanistan Republic Day Festival Cup on 21 July 1976 is considered as full A international by some RSSSF sources.)

	Total	In India	In Pakistan	Neutral Venue
Matches	29	8	5	16
**India Won**	**18**	**6**	**2**	**10**
**Pakistan Won**	3	1	1	1
**Draws**	8	1	2	5

#	Date	Venue	Competition	Home team	Score	Away team	Goals (home)	Goals (away)
1	23 March 1952	Colombo Oval, Colombo, Ceylon	1952 Colombo Cup	India	0–0	Pakistan		
2	23 October 1953	Aung San Stadium, Rangoon, Burma	1953 Colombo Cup	India	1–0	Pakistan	D'Souza 59'	
-	3 November 1953	Aung San Stadium, Rangoon, Burma	Non-FIFA Friendly	Pakistan	1–0	India	Kutty	
3	26 December 1954	Calcutta FC Ground, Calcutta, India	1954 Colombo Cup	India	3–1	Pakistan	Thapa	Fakhri
4	24 December 1955	Dacca Stadium, Dacca, East Pakistan	1955 Colombo Cup	Pakistan	1–2	India	Fakhri	Banerjee D'Souza
-	25 December 1955	Dacca Stadium, Dacca, East Pakistan	Non-FIFA Friendly	Pakistan	1–0	India	Tajul Islam Manna	
5	7 December 1959	Maharaja's College Stadium, Kochi, India	1960 AFC Asian Cup qualification	India	1–0	Pakistan	D'Souza	
6	13 December 1959	Maharaja's College Stadium, Kochi, India	1960 AFC Asian Cup qualification	India	0–1	Pakistan		Abdullah 13'
7	15 November 1967	Rangoon, Burma	1968 AFC Asian Cup qualification	Pakistan	1–1	India	Bakhsh 50'	Chatterjee 1'
8	21 July 1976	Ghazi Stadium, Kabul, Afghanistan	Afghanistan Republic Day Festival Cup	Pakistan	1–1	India	Iftikhar Gaga	Harjinder Singh
9	17 October 1984	Calcutta, India	1984 AFC Asian Cup qualification	India	2–0	Pakistan	Shabbir Ali 24', 82'	
10	21 November 1987	Calcutta, India	1987 South Asian Games	India	0–0	Pakistan		
11	22 December 1991	Sugathadasa Stadium, Colombo, Sri Lanka	1991 South Asian Games	Pakistan	0–0	India		
12	9 May 1992	Salt Lake Stadium, Kolkata, India	1992 AFC Asian Cup qualification	India	2–0	Pakistan	Vijayan 3', 81'	
13	23 July 1993	Railway Stadium, Lahore, Pakistan	1993 SAARC Gold	Pakistan	1–1	India	Nauman	Vijayan
14	15 December 1993	Bangabandhu National Stadium, Dhaka, Bangladesh	1993 South Asian Games	Pakistan	2–2	India	Nauman	Bhupinder Thakur Tejinder Kumar
15	11 September 1997	Dasarath Rangasala Stadium, Kathmandu, Nepal	1997 SAFF Gold Cup	India	2–0	Pakistan	Vijayan 42', 76'	
16	26 April 1999	Jawaharlal Nehru Stadium, Goa, India	1999 SAFF Gold Cup	India	2–0	Pakistan	Bhutia 24' Syed Shabir Pasha 87'	
17	26 September 1999	Dasarath Rangasala Stadium, Kathmandu, Nepal	1999 South Asian Games	India	5–2	Pakistan	Jules C. Dias Alberto 8' Syed Shabbir Pasha 12'Vijayan 52', 61', 73' (pen.)	Yousaf 76' Zaman 90+1'
18	10 January 2003	Bangabandhu Stadium, Dhaka, Bangladesh	2003 SAFF Gold Cup	India	0–1	Pakistan		Rasool 50'
19	20 January 2003	Bangabandhu Stadium, Dhaka, Bangladesh	2003 SAFF Gold Cup Third place	India	2–1	Pakistan	Vijayan 56' Jadav 99'	Rasool 66'
20	12 June 2005	Ayub National Stadium, Quetta, Pakistan	Friendly	Pakistan	1–1	India	Essa 78'	Chhetri 65'
21	16 June 2005	Qayyum Stadium, Peshawar, Pakistan	Friendly	Pakistan	0–1	India		MA Abdul Hakkim 67'
22	18 June 2005	Punjab Stadium, Lahore, Pakistan	Friendly	Pakistan	3–0	India	Essa 2' Ahmed 45+1' Mehmood 46'	
23	5 June 2008	Rasmee Dhandu Stadium, Malé, Maldives	2008 SAFF Championship	India	2–1	Pakistan	Pradeep 25' Dias 45+1'	Adnan Ahmed 88'
24	23 March 2011	MBPJ Stadium, Petaling Jaya, Malaysia	2012 AFC Challenge Cup qualification	Pakistan	1–3	India	Mehmood 32'	Lalpekhlua 67', 90+4' Dias 90'
25	1 September 2013	Halchowk Stadium, Kathmandu, Nepal	2013 SAFF Championship	India	1–0	Pakistan	Ishaq 14' (o.g.)	
26	12 September 2018	Bangabandhu National Stadium, Dhaka, Bangladesh	2018 SAFF Championship	India	3–1	Pakistan	Singh 48', 69' Passi 84'	Bashir 88'
27	21 June 2023	Sree Kanteerava Stadium, Bengaluru, India	2023 SAFF Championship	India	4–0	Pakistan	Chhetri 10', 16' (pen.), 73' (pen.) Udanta 81'	
28	5 November 2026	National Stadium, Dhaka, Bangladesh	2026 SAFF Championship	Pakistan	2–3	India	Najeeb 90+1' Ghazi 90+4'	Suhail 13', 19' Kipgen 32'
29	17 November 2026	National Stadium, Dhaka, Bangladesh	2026 SAFF Championship	India	2–1	Pakistan	Bhat 61' Mandi 88'	Ghazi 45+1'

- **Bold** indicates most wins

Most Goals
India: 47 Goals
Pakistan: 22 Goals

- The Largest victory between this two nations is favour to **India**.

India 4–0 Pakistan (2023 SAFF Championship, 21 June 2023)

==== Women's matches ====
As of 7 September 2022

	Total	In India	In Pakistan	Neutral Venue
Matches	4	0	0	4
**India Won**	**4**	**0**	**0**	**4**
**Pakistan Won**	0	0	0	0
**Draws**	0	0	0	0

#	Date	Venue	Competition	Home team	Score	Away team	Goals (home)	Goals (away)
1	31 January 2010	National Stadium, Dhaka, Bangladesh	2010 South Asian Games	India	**6–0**	Pakistan	Sasmita Malik 7', 28'; Bembem Devi 10', 11', 17'; Laishram Naobi Chanu 90'	
2	20 December 2010	Cox's Bazar Stadium, Cox's Bazar, Bangladesh	2010 SAFF Championship	India	**8–0**	Pakistan	Bala Devi 18', 31', 32' Gayatri Mallick 26', 39' Sasmita 33' Amoolya 45' Manpreet 88'	
3	7 September 2022	Dasharath Rangasala, Kathmandu, Nepal	2022 SAFF Championship	India	**3–0**	Pakistan	Maria 21' (o.g.); Grace 23'; Soumya 90+4'	
4	17 October 2024	Dasharath Rangasala, Kathmandu, Nepal	2024 SAFF Championship	Pakistan	**2–5**	India	Suha Hirani 45+2' (pen.) Kayla Siddiqi 47'	Dangmei 5', 42' Manisha 17' Bala Devi 35' Chouhan 78'

- **Bold** indicates most wins

Most Goals
India: 22 Goals
Pakistan: 2 Goals

- The Largest victory between this two nations is favour to **India**.

India 8–0 Pakistan (2010 SAFF Women's Championship, 20 December 2010)

== Athletics ==
As of August 2024, India and Pakistan faced in several athletic events at both continent level and international level.

=== Summer Olympics ===
	**India**	**Pakistan**
**Gold**	**1**	**1**
**Silver**	**3**	0
**Bronze**	0	0
Total	4	1

=== World Athletic Championships ===
	**India**	**Pakistan**
**Gold**	**1**	0
**Silver**	**1**	**1**
**Bronze**	**1**	0
Total	3	1

=== Asian Athletic Championships ===
	**India**	**Pakistan**
**Gold**	**102**	3
**Silver**	**130**	3
**Bronze**	**146**	3
Total	378	9

=== Asian Indoor Athletic Championships ===
	**India**	**Pakistan**
**Gold**	**17**	0
**Silver**	**33**	1
**Bronze**	**23**	1
Total	73	2

=== Asian Marathon Championships ===
	**India**	**Pakistan**
**Gold**	**3**	0
**Silver**	**1**	0
**Bronze**	**3**	0
Total	7	0

=== Asian Cross Country Championships ===
	**India**	**Pakistan**
**Gold**	**7**	0
**Silver**	**15**	1
**Bronze**	**13**	1
Total	35	2

=== Asian Race Walking Championships ===
	**India**	**Pakistan**
**Gold**	**2**	0
**Silver**	**2**	0
**Bronze**	**5**	0
Total	9	0

- **Bold** indicates most wins

== Badminton ==
As of 2022, Pakistan is yet to win any medal in major tournaments.

=== World Championship matches ===
	**India**	**Pakistan**
**Gold**	**1**	0
**Silver**	**4**	0
**Bronze**	**11**	0
Total	16	0

=== Thomas & Uber Cup ===
	**India**	**Pakistan**
**Gold**	**1**	0
**Silver**	**0**	0
**Bronze**	**3**	0
Total	4	0

=== Asian Badminton Championships ===
	**India**	**Pakistan**
**Gold**	**2**	0
**Silver**	**1**	0
**Bronze**	**16**	0
Total	19	0

=== Asian Badminton Team Championships ===
	**India**	**Pakistan**
**Gold**	**1**	0
**Silver**	**1**	0
**Bronze**	**4**	1
Total	6	1

- **Bold** indicates most wins

== Basketball ==
=== Men's ===
Tournament	Matches played	**India won**	**Pakistan won**
FIBA Asia Cup	4	**4**	0
Total	4	4	0

== Chess ==
As of 2023, Pakistan is yet to win any medal in major tournaments.

=== World Championship matches ===
	**India**	**Pakistan**
**Gold**	**1**	0
**Silver**	**1**	0
**Bronze**	**1**	0
Total	3	0

=== International Chess Olympiad ===
	**India**	**Pakistan**
**Gold**	**2**	0
**Silver**	0	0
**Bronze**	**3**	0
Total	5	0

=== Asian Team Championships ===
	**India**	**Pakistan**
**Gold**	**3**	0
**Silver**	**11**	0
**Bronze**	**7**	0
Total	21	0

- **Bold** indicates most wins

== Men's cricket ==
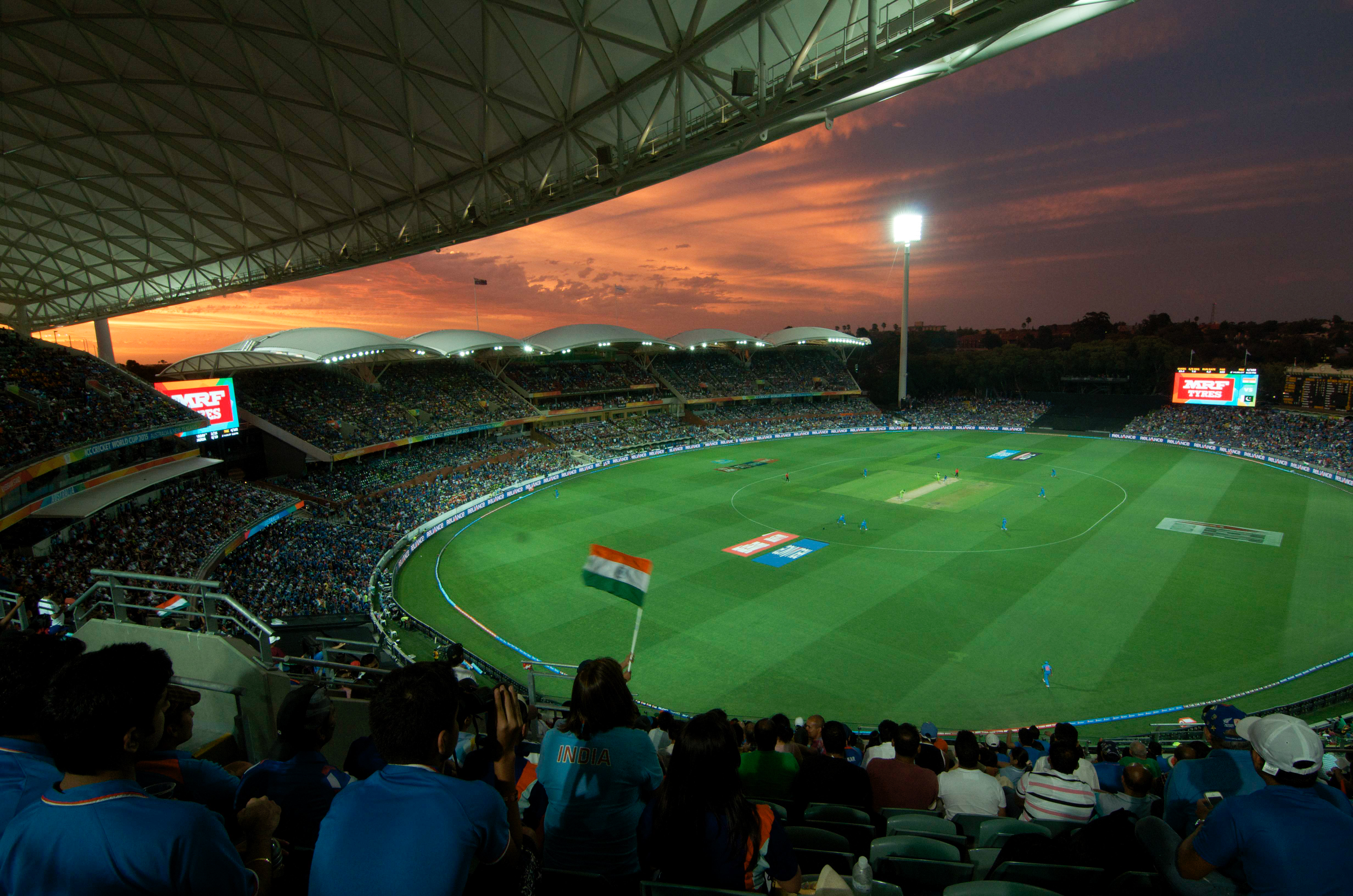
Panoramic view of a 2015 Cricket World Cup match between India and Pakistan

The two sides first played in 1952, when Pakistan toured India. Test and, later, limited overs series have been played ever since, although a number of planned tours by both sides have been cancelled or aborted due to political factors. No cricket was played between the two countries between 1962 and 1977 due to two major wars in 1965 and 1971 and the 1999 Kargil War and the 2008 Mumbai terrorist attacks have also interrupted cricketing ties between the two nations.

=== Head-to-head in ICC tournaments ===
Tournament	Matches played	**India wins**	**Pakistan wins**	No result
World Cup	8	**8**	0	0
T20 World Cup	9	**8**	1	0
Champions Trophy	6	3	3	0
Total	23	19	4	0

=== Head-to-head in ACC tournaments ===
Tournament	Matches played	**India wins**	**Pakistan wins**	No result
Asia Cup (ODI)	15	**8**	5	2 (Note: The 1987 Asia Cup match was abandoned after nine overs due to bad light and rain. It was due to be replayed the following day but this match was abandoned without a ball being bowled due to rain.)
Asia Cup (Twenty20)	6	**5**	1	0
Asian Test Championship	1	0	**1**	0
Total	22	13	7	2

=== Head-to-head in Multi-sport events ===
Tournament	Matches played	India wins	Pakistan wins	No result
Asian Games (T20)	1	**1**	0	0
Total	1	1	0	0

=== Overall summary of results ===
Format	Matches played	**India wins**	**Pakistan wins**	Draw/No result	Notes
Test	59	9	**12**	38	(Note: One Test match between the two sides was cancelled following the assassination of Indira Gandhi in 1984.)
ODI	136	58	**73**	5	(Note: In addition, four matches between the two sides have been abandoned without a ball being bowled and one match in 1984 was cancelled following the assassination of Indira Gandhi.)
T20I	18	**15**	3	0	
Total	213	82	88	43	

== Women's cricket ==
=== Head-to-head in ICC tournaments ===
Tournament	Matches played	**India women's wins**	**Pakistan women's wins**	No result	Notes
Women's World Cup	5	**5**	0	0	
Women's T20 World Cup	9	**7**	2	0	
Total	14	12	2	0	

=== Head-to-head in ACC tournaments ===
Tournament	Matches played	**India women's wins**	**Pakistan women's wins**	No result	Notes
Women's Asia Cup (ODI)	6	**6**	0	0	
Women's Asia Cup (Twenty20)	8	**7**	1	0	
Total	14	13	1	0	

=== Overall summary of results ===
Format	Matches played	**India women's wins**	**Pakistan women's wins**	No result	Notes
ODI	12	**12**	0	0	
T20I	18	**15**	3	0	
Total	30	27	3	0	

== Men's field hockey ==
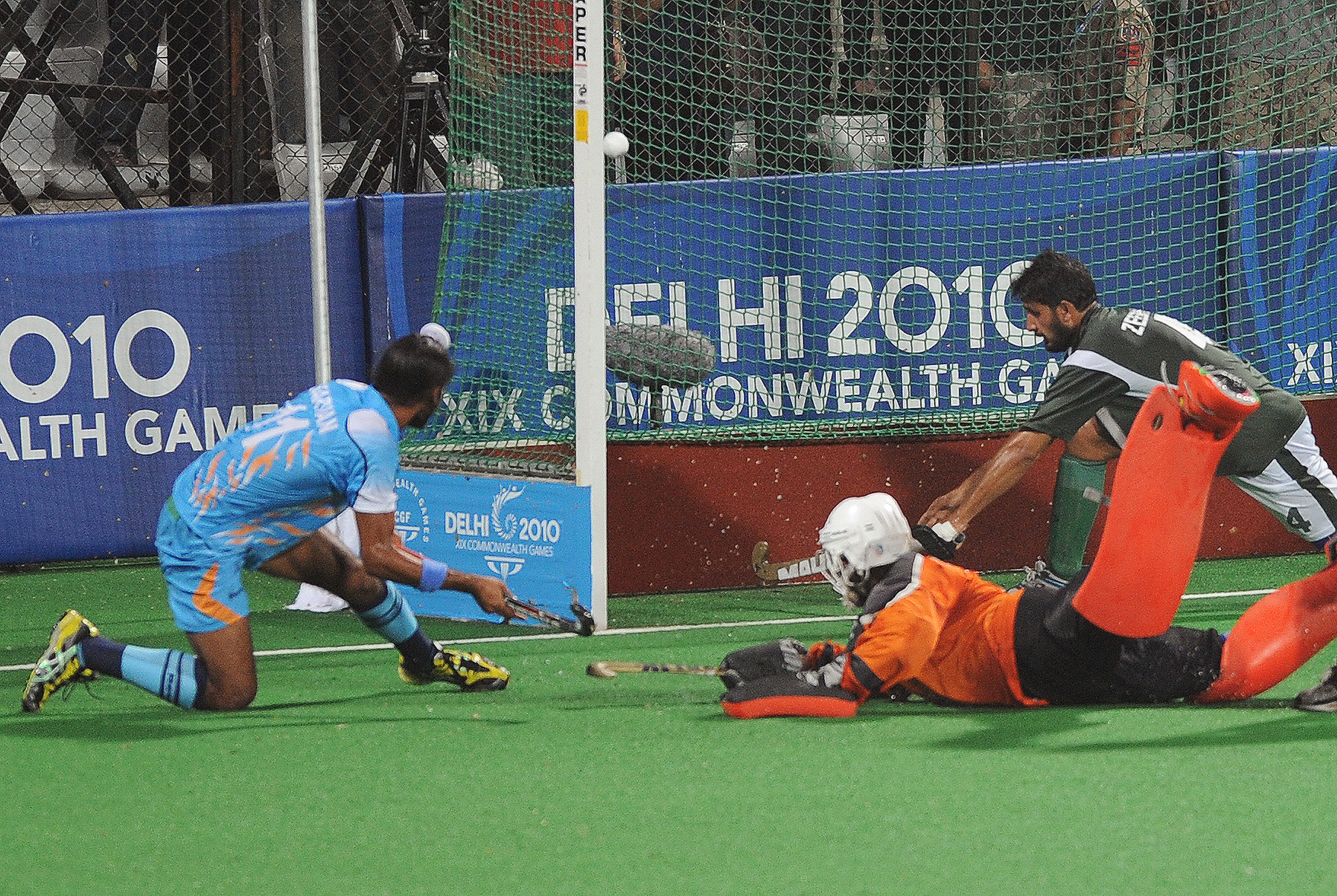
2010 Commonwealth Games hockey match played between India and Pakistan in Delhi

The rivalry is among the most intense sports rivalries in the Asia and the world in the sport of field hockey. They participate in World Cup, FIH Pro League, Summer Olympic Games, Commonwealth Games, Asia Cup, Men's Asian Champions Trophy, Asian Games, South Asian Games and Sultan Azlan Shah Cup.

=== Head to Head in Tournaments ===
Tournament	Matches	Results			Goals	
Tournament	Matches	India	Pakistan	Draw	India	Pakistan
Test series	52	16	**25**	11	104	**124**
Summer Olympics	7	2	**4**	1	3	**8**
World Cup	6	**4**	2	0	**15**	10
FIH Pro League	2	**2**	0	0	**11**	4
Champions Trophy	19	7	**12**	0	48	**54**
Asian Games	17	6	**8**	3	31	**34**
Asia Cup	9	3	**5**	1	18	**20**
Asian Hockey Champions Trophy	12	**8**	2	2	**32**	22
Commonwealth Games	3	1	1	1	10	10
FIH Hockey World League	3	**2**	0	1	**15**	4
Afro-Asian Games	2	**2**	0	0	**7**	3
**Other Matches (Continent wise)**
Africa	2	**1**	0	1	**5**	2
Americas	2	0	**1**	1	5	**8**
Asia	34	14	14	6	65	**67**
Europe	10	1	**8**	1	16	**33**
Oceania	5	**2**	0	3	**12**	9
**Total**	**185**	**71**	**82**	**32**	**399**	**413**

=== Summary of overall results ===
Year	Matches	Results			Goals	
Year	Matches	India won	Pakistan won	Draw	India	Pakistan
1950s	2	**1**	0	1	**1**	0
1960s	6	2	**3**	1	3	**5**
1970s	13	3	**9**	1	10	**27**
1980s	46	14	**22**	10	79	**111**
1990s	26	9	**13**	4	52	**62**
2000s	47	14	**27**	6	108	**128**
2010s	35	**19**	8	8	**102**	62
2020s	10	**9**	0	1	**44**	18
Total	185	71	82	32	399	413

- The Largest victory between this two nations is favour to **India**.

India 10–2 Pakistan (Asian Games, 30 Sep 2023)

=== U21 ===
	Matches	Results		
	Matches	India won	Pakistan won	Draw
1980s	1	0	**1**	0
1990s	1	0	0	**1**
2000s	2	**2**	0	0
2010s	8	**5**	0	3
2020s	6	2	0	**4**
Total	18	9	1	8

=== U18 ===
	Matches	Results		
	Matches	India won	Pakistan won	Draw
2000s	1	0	**1**	0
2010s	1	**1**	0	0
2020s	1	**1**	0	0
Total	3	2	1	0

=== Senior Hockey5s ===
Year	Matches	Results			Goals	
Year	Matches	India won	Pakistan won	Draw	India	Pakistan
2020s	3	0	1	**2**	10	**11**
Total	3	0	1	2	10	11

=== U18 Hockey5s ===
Year	Matches	Results			Goals	
Year	Matches	India won	Pakistan won	Draw	India	Pakistan
2020s	3	**3**	0	0	**17**	8
Total	3	3	0	0	17	8

== Women's field hockey ==
Indian women hockey are much ahead when it comes to winning major tournaments. Pakistani women's team has been weaker competitively and is yet to win a medal in major tournament.

=== Indian Women ===
Tournament	Gold	Silver	Bronze	Total
Pro League	0	0	1	1
Nations Cup	2	0	0	2
Asian Games	2	2	4	8
Commonwealth Games	1	1	1	3
Asia Cup	2	3	3	8
Asian Champions Trophy	3	2	1	6
Champions Challenge	0	0	1	1
Afro-Asian Games	1	0	0	1
Hockey Series	1	0	0	1
South Asian Games	1	0	0	1
Total	13	8	11	32

=== Pakistan Women ===
Tournament	Gold	Silver	Bronze	Total
Total	0	0	0	0

=== U21 ===
	Matches	Results		
	Matches	India won	Pakistan won	Draw
2020s	1	**1**	0	0
Total	1	1	0	0

== Handball ==
=== Men's ===
Tournament	Matches played	**India won**	**Pakistan won**
Asian Games	1	**1**	0
South Asian Games	3	1	**2**
South Asian Handball Championship	3	**3**	0
Total	7	5	2

=== Women's ===
Tournament	Matches played	**India won**	**Pakistan won**
South Asian Games	2	**2**	0
South Asian Handball Championship	1	**1**	0
IHF Trophy South Central Asia	1	**1**	0
Total	4	4	0

== Kabaddi ==
It is popular in the Indian subcontinent and other surrounding Asian countries. Although accounts of kabaddi appear in the histories of ancient India, the game was popularised as a competitive sport in the 20th century.

Men's

Tournament	**India**	**Pakistan**
Kabaddi World Cup (Standard style)	**3**	0
Kabaddi World Cup (Circle style)	**6**	1
Asian Games	**8**	0
Asian Kabaddi Championship	**8**	0
Asia Kabaddi Cup (Circle style)	1	**2**
South Asian Games	**10**	1
Total	36	4

Women's

Tournament	**India**	**Pakistan**
Women Kabaddi World Cup	**4**	0
Asian Kabaddi Championship	**4**	0
Asian Games	**3**	0
South Asian Games	**4**	0
Total	15	0

== Rugby ==
=== Men's ===
Matches played	**India won**	**Pakistan won**	**India goals**	**Pakistan goals**
7	**7**	0	**322**	33

== Squash ==
=== World Squash Championships ===
	**India**	**Pakistan**
**Gold**	0	**14**
**Silver**	0	**9**
**Bronze**	-	-
Total	0	23

=== British Open Squash Championships ===
	**India**	**Pakistan**
**Gold**	0	**30**
**Silver**	1	**25**
**Bronze**	-	-
Total	1	55

=== WSF World Team Squash Championships ===
	**India**	**Pakistan**
**Gold**	0	**6**
**Silver**	0	**4**
**Bronze**	0	**1**
Total	0	11

=== PSA Squash Tour Finals ===
	**India**	**Pakistan**
**Gold**	0	**4**
**Silver**	0	0
**Bronze**	-	-
Total	0	4

=== Tournament of Champions (squash) ===
	**India**	**Pakistan**
**Gold**	0	**22**
**Silver**	1	**8**
**Bronze**	-	-
Total	1	30

=== United States Open ===
	**India**	**Pakistan**
**Gold**	0	**29**
**Silver**	0	**19**
**Bronze**	-	-
Total	0	48

=== Hong Kong Open ===
	**India**	**Pakistan**
**Gold**	0	**8**
**Silver**	0	**1**
**Bronze**	-	-
Total	0	9

=== Windy City Open ===
	**India**	**Pakistan**
**Gold**	**2**	0
**Silver**	1	1
**Bronze**	-	-
Total	3	1

=== Squash at the Commonwealth Games ===
	**India**	**Pakistan**
**Gold**	**1**	0
**Silver**	**2**	0
**Bronze**	**2**	0
Total	5	0

=== Squash at the Asian Games ===
	**India**	**Pakistan**
**Gold**	**3**	2
**Silver**	4	4
**Bronze**	**11**	3
Total	18	9

== Tennis ==
=== Davis Cup ===
Year	Matches played	India won	**Pakistan won**
1960s	3	3	0
1970s	3	3	0
2000s	1	1	0
2010s	1	1	0
2020s	1	1	0
Total	9	9	0

=== Billie Jean King Cup ===
Year	Matches played	**India won**	**Pakistan won**
1990s	1	**1**	0
2010s	2	**2**	0
Total	3	3	0

== Volleyball ==
=== Men's ===
Tournament	Matches played	**India won**	**Pakistan won**
Asian Games	6	3	3
Asian Championship	8	**6**	2
CAVA Nations League	1	**1**	0
South Asian Games	9	**8**	1
Total	24	18	6

== Wrestling ==
India and Pakistan are big wrestling nations and they played against each other in several International tournaments.

As of 2024 Olympics

=== Summer Olympics ===
	**India**	**Pakistan**
**Gold**	**0**	0
**Silver**	**2**	0
**Bronze**	**6**	1
Total	8	1

=== World Wrestling Championships ===
	**India**	**Pakistan**
**Gold**	**1**	0
**Silver**	**5**	0
**Bronze**	**18**	2
Total	24	2

As of 2022 Asian Games

=== Asian Games ===
	**India**	**Pakistan**
**Gold**	**11**	6
**Silver**	**15**	14
**Bronze**	**39**	14
Total	65	34

As of 2023 Asian Wrestling Championships

=== Asian Wrestling Championships ===
	**India**	**Pakistan**
**Gold**	**28**	1
**Silver**	**91**	9
**Bronze**	**153**	8
Total	272	18

As of 2022 Commonwealth Games

=== Commonwealth Games ===
	**India**	**Pakistan**
**Gold**	**49**	21
**Silver**	**39**	14
**Bronze**	**26**	11
Total	114	46

- **Bold** indicates most wins

== See also ==
- List of sports rivalries
- India–Pakistan relations
- Sport in India
- Sport in Pakistan
