= Gujrat Warriors =

- GW

Personnel
- Captain: Tehseen Ullah
- Owner: AF Sports

Team information
- City: Gujrat, Punjab, Pakistan
- Colors: Yellow, green
- Founded: 2018

Gujrat Warriors (GW) is a Kabaddi club based in Gujrat, Punjab, Pakistan that plays in the Super Kabaddi League (SKL). The team is currently led by Tehseen Ullah. The team was the inaugural champions of the 2018 Super Kabaddi League.

== Franchise history ==
Super Kabaddi League is a professional Kabaddi league in Pakistan, based on the format of group games and eliminator. The first edition of the tournament was played in 2018 with ten franchises representing various cities in Pakistan.

Gujrat Warriors won the inaugural Super Kabaddi League after defeating Faisalabad Sherdils by 38-26 in the final. Gujrat Warriors' Tehseen Ullah was declared the Man of the Final.

== Current squad ==
No.	Name	Nation	Birth date	Position
2	Tehseen Ullah (C)	(Pakistan)	26 May 1988 (age 37)	Raider
11	Sabir Ali	(Pakistan)	7 August 1992 (age 33)	All Rounder
20	Waqar Ali	(Pakistan)	7 October 1995 (age 30)	All Rounder
23	Dildar Ahmed	(Pakistan)	17 September 1998 (age 27)	All Rounder
9	Asad Ali	(Pakistan)	5 May 1991 (age 34)	All Rounder
4	Shabbir Ullah	(Pakistan)	10 May 1992 (age 33)	Raider
1	Saif Ullah	(Pakistan)	5 April 1997 (age 28)	All Rounder
27	Rai Mubashir Ali	(Pakistan)	20 April 1986 (age 39)	All Rounder
22	M. Tariq	(Pakistan)	1 January 1999 (age 27)	All Rounder
3	M. Baba Ali	(Iran)	9 May 1982 (age 43)	Defender

== See also ==
- Super Kabaddi League
- Pakistan national kabaddi team
- Pakistan Kabaddi Federation
