= 2012 Asia Kabaddi Cup (circle style) =

Tournament information
- Administrator: Pakistan Kabaddi Federation
- Format: Circle Style
- Tournament format(s): Round-robin and Knockout
- Host: Pakistan
- Venue: Punjab Stadium
- Participants: 6

Final positions
- Champions: Pakistan (1st title)
- 1st runners-up: India
- 2nd runners-up: Iran

The 2012 Asia Kabaddi Cup was the second edition of the Asia Kabaddi Cup (circle style). It was held in Lahore, Punjab, Pakistan from 1 to 5 November 2012 with teams from 6 Asian countries. It was won by Pakistan who won the competition by technical rule as India decided to walk out of the match. India forfeited the match with 6 minutes remaining in the last game claiming that the officials were unfair to them. Things worsened further when Indian coach Goormel Singh was shown a green card by the referee for his 'constant interference in field matters'. He was said to have crossed the line literally, entering the field of play when he shouldn't have. This gave rise to heated arguments between the two teams and the scene ended with India walking out in protest.

== Teams ==
- Pakistan
- India
- Afghanistan
- Nepal
- Iran
- Sri Lanka

== Broadcasting ==
- Geo Super

== Opening ceremony ==
The opening ceremony was held at Punjab Stadium in Lahore, Punjab, Pakistan on November 1, 2012, and aired live on Geo Super.

== Prize money ==
The organizers allocated a cash prize of Rs. 1.5 million (US$15,790) for the winners while the runners-up and third positioned teams were awarded cash prizes of US$10,526 and US$5,263, respectively.

== Schedule ==
All matches' timings were according to Indian Standard Time (UTC +5:30).

=== Round Robin ===
1 November 2012
21:30

Pakistan	60 – 42	Iran

Punjab Stadium, Lahore

1 November 2012
22:30

India	68 – 28	Afghanistan

Punjab Stadium, Lahore

1 November 2012
23:30

Sri Lanka	48 – 33	Nepal

Punjab Stadium, Lahore

2 November 2012
21:30

India	55 – 15	Sri Lanka

Punjab Stadium, Lahore

2 November 2012
22:30

Pakistan	53 – 21	Nepal

Punjab Stadium, Lahore

2 November 2012
23:30

Iran	89 – 17	Afghanistan

Punjab Stadium, Lahore

3 November 2012
21:30

Iran	66 – 14	Sri Lanka

Punjab Stadium, Lahore

3 November 2012
22:30

Pakistan	57 – 33	Nepal

Punjab Stadium, Lahore

3 November 2012
23:30

India	50 – 22	Afghanistan

Punjab Stadium, Lahore

4 November 2012
21:30

Pakistan	46 – 26	Sri Lanka

Punjab Stadium, Lahore

4 November 2012
22:30

India	53 – 35	Iran

Punjab Stadium, Lahore

4 November 2012
23:30

Afghanistan	53 – 32	Nepal

Punjab Stadium, Lahore

5 November 2012
21:30

Iran	72 – 27	Nepal

Punjab Stadium, Lahore

5 November 2012
22:30

Sri Lanka	51 – 42	Afghanistan

Punjab Stadium, Lahore

5 November 2012
23:30

India	31 – 40	Pakistan

Punjab Stadium, Lahore

== Final Ranking ==
Rank	Team	M	W	D	L	GF	GA	GD	Points
1	Pakistan	6	0	0	0	0	0	0	0
2	India	6	0	0	0	0	0	0	0
3	Iran	6	0	0	0	0	0	0	0
4	Sri Lanka	6	0	0	0	0	0	0	0
5	Afghanistan	6	0	0	0	0	0	0	0
6	Nepal	6	0	0	0	0	0	0	0
