= 2016 Asia Kabaddi Cup (circle style) =

3rd Asia Circle Style Kabaddi Cup 2016

Tournament information
- Dates: May 2–May 6
- Administrator: Pakistan Kabaddi Federation
- Format: Circle Style
- Host: Pakistan
- Venue: POF Sports Complex
- Participants: 6

Final positions
- Champions: Pakistan
- 1st runners-up: India
- 2nd runners-up: Iran

Tournament statistics
- Matches played: 15

2016 Asia Kabaddi Cup was the third season of the Asia Kabaddi Cup (circle style) hosted by Pakistan which commenced from May 2, 2016, in Pakistan Ordnance Factory Sports Complex, Wah Cantt. The last match of this event was played on May 6. The event was broadcast live on PTV Sports.

The six Asian kabaddi teams that came to play in this event were Pakistan (hosts), Afghanistan, India, Iran, Nepal and Sri Lanka. The match between Pakistan and India (last match of the league) ended 50–31 in favor of Pakistan. Since both teams were undefeated going into that match, it functioned as the "Final". Iran solidified their status as the third-best team in Asia by defeating Afghanistan.

== Teams ==
- India
- Pakistan
- Afghanistan
- Nepal
- Iran
- Sri Lanka

== Matches ==
=== Day 1 ===
2 May 2016
21:25

Pakistan	47 – 22	Iran

POF Sports Complex

2 May 2016
22:45

India	45 – 18	Sri Lanka

POF Sports Complex

2 May 2016
23:50

Nepal	11 – 40	Afghanistan

POF Sports Complex

=== Day 2 ===
3 May 2016
19:30

Pakistan	56 – 23	Sri Lanka

POF Sports Complex

3 May 2016
21:00

India	48 – 20	Afghanistan

POF Sports Complex

3 May 2016
22:20

Nepal	14 – 31	Iran

POF Sports Complex

=== Day 3 ===
4 May 2016
19:30

Pakistan	43 – 13	Afghanistan

POF Sports Complex

4 May 2016
21:00

Nepal	16 – 48	India

POF Sports Complex

4 May 2016
22:20

Iran	36 – 10	Sri Lanka

POF Sports Complex

=== Day 4 ===
5 May 2016
19:30

Pakistan	41 – 18	Nepal

POF Sports Complex

5 May 2016
21:00

Iran	30 – 43	India

POF Sports Complex

5 May 2016
22:20

Afghanistan	57 – 25	Sri Lanka

POF Sports Complex

=== Day 5 ===
6 May 2016
19:30

Afghanistan	14 – 57	Iran

POF Sports Complex

6 May 2016
21:00

Nepal	? – ?	Sri Lanka

POF Sports Complex

6 May 2016
22:20

Pakistan	50 – 31	India

POF Sports Complex

== Final Ranking ==
Rank	Team	M	W	D	L	GF	GA	GD	Points
1	Pakistan	6	0	0	0	0	0	0	0
2	India	6	0	0	0	0	0	0	0
3	Iran	6	0	0	0	0	0	0	0
4	Sri Lanka	6	0	0	0	0	0	0	0
5	Afghanistan	6	0	0	0	0	0	0	0
6	Nepal	6	0	0	0	0	0	0	0
