= World Beach Kabaddi Championship =

International kabaddi competition

- Most recent season or competition: 2024
- Sport: Beach kabaddi
- Founded: 2024; 2 years ago
- First season: 2024
- Administrator: International Kabaddi Federation
- Region: International
- Most recent champion: Iran (1st title)
- Most titles: Iran (1 title)

The World Beach Kabaddi Championship is an international Beach kabaddi competition conducted by the International Kabaddi Federation (IKF). In 2024, the first World Beach Kabaddi Championship was held in Iran and was won by the hosts.

With the return of international kabaddi post COVID-19 pandemic and the 2022 Asian Games, the IKF in 2024 announced the calendar with start of the World Beach Kabaddi Championship in 2024.

== Summary ==
=== Men ===
| Year | Host | Final | | | Third place | | |
| Year | Host | Champions | Score | Runner-up | Third place | | |
|---|---|---|---|---|---|---|---|
| 2024 | (Iran); Anzali | Iran | 41–34 | Pakistan | Kenya | and | Iraq |

== Team appearances ==
| Team | (Iran) 2024 | Total |
|---|---|---|
| Denmark | GS | 1 |
| Germany | GS | 1 |
| Iran | 1st | 1 |
| Iraq | SF | 1 |
| Kenya | SF | 1 |
| Lebanon | GS | 1 |
| Nepal | GS | 1 |
| Pakistan | 2nd | 1 |
| Palestine | GS | 1 |
| Turkmenistan | GS | 1 |
| Total | 10 | |

== Results ==
=== 2024 ===
A: Iran/Iraq/Nepal/Turkmenistan/Denmark/

B: Pakistan/Kenya/Lebanon/Palestine/Germany/

5 To 8 Mehr 1403

1. Lebanon - Pakistan
2. Lebanon - Germany
3. Lebanon - Kenya
4. Germany - Palestine
5. Pakistan - Palestine

1. Kenya 66-14 Palestine
2. Pakistan 75-24 Germany
3. Iraq 56-24 Denmark
4. Iran 63-31 Nepal
5. Pakistan 45-32 Kenya
6. Palestine 42-21 Lebanon
7. Iran 57-27 Denmark
8. Iraq 63-16 Turkmenistan
9. Nepal 76-18 Denmark
10. Iran 59-25 Turkmenistan
11. Kenya 59-31 Germany
12. Nepal 72-18 Turkmenistan
13. Iran 51-27 Iraq
14. Iraq 56-33 Nepal
15. Turkmenistan 48-24 Denmark

Semifinal:

1. Pakistan 57-22 Iraq
2. Iran 49-30 Kenya

Final:

1. Iran 41-34 Pakistan
