= Pakistan national kabaddi team =

National kabaddi team of Pakistan

Pakistan
- Association: Pakistan Kabaddi Federation
- Confederation: Asian Kabaddi Federation (AKF)
- Head Coach: Badshah Gul
- Captain: Shafique Ahmad Chishti
- Most caps: Muhammad Irfan (230)

World Cup
- 0

Asian Games
- 10 (first in 1990)
- (silver) 2nd (1998, 2006)

Asian Championship
- 3 (first in 2000)
- (silver) 2nd (2005, 2017)
Medal record
Event	1st	2nd	3rd
Circle World Cup	1	4	1
Asian Games	0	2	7
Asian Championship	0	2	1
Asian Indoor Games	0	1	0
Asian Beach Games	1	4	1
Circle Asia Cup	2	1	0
World Beach Championship	0	1	0
South Asian Games	1	6	4
Dubai Kabaddi Masters	0	0	1
Total	5	21	15
Circle World Cup
Gold medal – first place	2020 Pakistan	Team
Silver medal – second place	2010 India	Team
Silver medal – second place	2012 India	Team
Silver medal – second place	2013 India	Team
Silver medal – second place	2014 India	Team
Bronze medal – third place	2011 India	Team
Asian Games
Silver medal – second place	2006 Doha	Team
Silver medal – second place	1998 Bangkok	Team
Bronze medal – third place	1990 Beijing	Team
Bronze medal – third place	1994 Hiroshima	Team
Bronze medal – third place	2002 Busan	Team
Bronze medal – third place	2010 Guangzhou	Team
Bronze medal – third place	2014 Incheon	Team
Bronze medal – third place	2018 Jakarta	Team
Bronze medal – third place	2022 Hangzhou	Team
Asian Championship
Silver medal – second place	2005 Tehran	Team
Silver medal – second place	2017 Gorgan	Team
Bronze medal – third place	2000 Colombo	Team
Asian Indoor Games
Silver medal – second place	2007 Macau	Team
Asian Beach Games
Gold medal – first place	2016 Danang	Team
Silver medal – second place	2010 Muscat	Team
Silver medal – second place	2012 Haiyang	Team
Silver medal – second place	2014 Phuket	Team
Silver medal – second place	2008 Bali	Team
Bronze medal – third place	2026 Sanya	Team
Circle Asia Cup
Gold medal – first place	2012 Pakistan	Team
Gold medal – first place	2016 Pakistan	Team
Silver medal – second place	2011 Iran	Team
World Beach Kabaddi Championship
Silver medal – second place	2024 Iran	Team
South Asian Games
Gold medal – first place	1993 Dhaka	Team
Bronze medal – third place	1985 Dhaka	Team
Bronze medal – third place	1987 Calcutta	Team
Silver medal – second place	1989 Islamabad	Team
Bronze medal – third place	1995 Madras	Team
Silver medal – second place	1999 Kathmandu	Team
Silver medal – second place	2004 Islamabad	Team
Silver medal – second place	2006 Colombo	Team
Silver medal – second place	2010 Dhaka	Team
Silver medal – second place	2016 Guwahati	Team
Bronze medal – third place	2019 Kathmandu–Pokhara	Team
Dubai Kabaddi Masters
Bronze medal – third place	2018 Dubai	Team

The Pakistan national kabaddi team represents Pakistan in international kabaddi. The Pakistan Kabaddi Federation manages the team.

== History ==
- The Pakistan national Kabaddi team have regularly won medals at the Asian Games and Kabaddi World Cup (circle style) but is yet to compete at the Kabaddi World Cup (standard style). In Asian Games, they have won seven bronze and two silver medals. Pakistan won the silver medal in men's kabaddi at the 2007 Asian Indoor Games in Macau, China, after losing to India in the final by a score of 35–17.
- Since 1985, Pakistan has taken part in 38 major international competitions in which they have reached the finals 25 times, winning five of those competitions, and being runners-up 20 times and had third-place finishes 13 times.

=== Performance in the World Beach Kabaddi Championship ===
- Pakistan secured a silver medal at the inaugural World Beach Kabaddi Championship 2024 in Bandar Anzali, Iran, after losing to the hosts in the final.

=== Performance in the Asian Games ===
- Pakistan had won a medal in every Asian Games kabaddi competition until the 2026 edition, where it failed to finish on the podium.
- Pakistan won bronze medals in the 1990 and 1994 Asian Games. In the 1998 edition, Pakistan bagged silver, losing to India in the final. Four years later, Pakistan won third place in 2002 Asian Games before losing gold to India by 35-23 in the 2006 Asian Games in Doha. Pakistan came third in the next four editions of Asian Games in 2010, 2014, 2018 and 2022.

=== Performance in the Asian Championship ===
- Pakistan has won three medals at the Asian Kabaddi Championships, including two silver medals in 2005 at Tehran and in 2017 at Gorgan and one bronze medal in 2000 at Colombo.

=== Performance in the South Asian Games ===
- Pakistan became champions of South Asia in 1993 by beating archrival India in the final. It was the only time Pakistan became champions of South Asia. After that Pakistani team played as finalists six times and won bronze medals four times but never won another championships.

=== Performance in the Cricle Asia Cup ===
- Pakistan became Asian champion in 2012 by beating India in the final of Circle Kabaddi Asia Cup after finishing as runner up in the previous edition.
- Pakistan became Asian champion for the second time in a row in 2016 after beating India by 50-31 in the final of the Circle Kabaddi Asian Cup.

=== Performance in the Asian Beach Games ===
- In 2016, Pakistan became Asian champion after beating India by 30-28 in the finals. It was the first title of Pakistan in the Asian Beach Games and before that Pakistan finished as runner up for four times in the last four competitions. Pakistan also won a bronze medal at the 2026 Asian Beach Games.

=== Performance in the World Cup (circle style) ===
- In 2020 Pakistan became World Champion after being runner up four times in the last five World Cup competitions, beating India by 43-41 at the Punjab Stadium in Lahore.

== Origination ==
Kabaddi is a traditional sport that originated in India and is part of the region's cultural heritage. The game is played across Asia and is known by various names: 'kabaddi' or 'kaudi' in Pakistan and India, 'Guddo' in Sri Lanka, and other names in Indonesia. Its rules also vary slightly between countries.

== Tournament records ==
=== Standard kabaddi ===
==== World Cup ====
Year	Rank	Pld	W	D	L
(India) 2004	Withdrew	0	0	0	0
(India) 2007	Withdrew	0	0	0	0
(India) 2016	Withdrew	0	0	0	0
Total	0/3	0	0	0	0

==== Asian Games ====
Year	Rank	M	W	D	L	PF	PA	PD
(China) 1990	Third place	6	3	1	2	134	131	+3
(Japan) 1994	Third place	4	2	0	2	153	90	+63
(Thailand) 1998	Runners-up	6	4	1	1	219	80	+139
(South Korea) 2002	Third place	5	3	0	2	87	106	-19
(Qatar) 2006	Runners-up	5	3	0	2	164	142	+22
(China) 2010	Third place	4	3	0	1	131	70	+61
(South Korea) 2014	Third place	4	2	0	2	100	89	+11
(Indonesia) 2018	Third place	6	4	0	2	209	125	+84
(China) 2022	Third place	4	2	0	2	144	160	-16
(Japan) 2026	Fifth place	4	2	0	2	198	164	+34
Total	10/10	48	28	2	18	1539	1157	+382

==== Asian Kabaddi Championship ====
Asian Kabaddi Championship
Year	Host country	Position
2000	Colombo, Sri Lanka	3rd place, bronze medalist(s)
2005	Tehran, Iran	2nd place, silver medalist(s)
2017	Gorgan, Iran	2nd place, silver medalist(s)

==== South Asian Games ====
South Asian Games
Year	Host city	Position
1985	Dhaka, Bangladesh	3rd place, bronze medalist(s)
1987	Kolkata, India	3rd place, bronze medalist(s)
1989	Islamabad, Pakistan	2nd place, silver medalist(s)
1993	Dhaka, Bangladesh	1st place, gold medalist(s)
1995	Madras, India	3rd place, bronze medalist(s)
1999	Kathmandu, Nepal	2nd place, silver medalist(s)
2004	Islamabad, Pakistan	2nd place, silver medalist(s)
2006	Colombo, Sri Lanka	2nd place, silver medalist(s)
2010	Dhaka, Bangladesh	2nd place, silver medalist(s)
2016	Guwahati & Shillong, India	2nd place, silver medalist(s)
2019	Kathmandu, Pokhara & Janakpur, Nepal	3rd place, bronze medalist(s)

==== Dubai Kabaddi Masters ====
Year	Rank	Pld	W	D	L
(United Arab Emirates) 2018	Third place	5	2	0	3
Total	1/1	5	2	0	3

=== Beach kabaddi ===
==== World Beach Kabaddi Championship ====
Year	Rank	Pld	W	D	L
(Iran) 2024	Runners-up	6	5	0	1
Total	1/1	6	5	0	1

==== Asian Beach Games ====
Year	Rank	Pld	W	D	L
(Indonesia) 2008	Runners-up	6	4	1	1
(Oman) 2010	Runners-up	6	5	0	1
(China) 2012	Runners-up	5	4	0	1
(Thailand) 2014	Runners-up	5	3	1	1
(Vietnam) 2016	Champions	4	3	1	0
(Vietnam) 2026	Third place	4	2	0	2
Total	6/6	30	21	3	6

=== Indoor kabaddi ===
==== Asian Indoor and Martial Games ====
Year	Rank	Pld	W	D	L
(Macau) 2007	Runners-up	7	5	0	2
(Vietnam) 2009	Did not enter				
(South Korea) 2013	Did not enter				
(Turkmenistan) 2017	Not contested				
Total	1/3	7	5	0	2

=== Circle kabaddi ===
==== Circle World Cup ====
Year	Rank	Pld	W	D	L
(India) 2010	Runners-up	5	4	0	1
(India) 2011	Third place	8	6	0	2
(India) 2012	Runners-up	5	4	0	1
(India) 2013	Runners-up	7	6	0	1
(India) 2014	Runners-up	7	6	0	1
(Pakistan) 2020	Champions	6	6	0	0
Total	6/6	38	32	0	6

==== Circle Asian Cup ====
Year	Rank	Pld	W	D	L
(India) 2011	Runners-up	5	4	0	1
(Pakistan) 2012	Champions	5	5	0	0
(Pakistan) 2016	Champions	5	5	0	0
Total	3/3	15	14	0	1

== Current squad ==
Player	Position	Franchise
Shafiq Chishti (Captain)	All-rounder	Faisalabad Sherdils
Mudassar Ali	All-rounder	Lahore Thunder
Nasir Ali	All-rounder	Gujrat Warriors
Waqas Butt	Raider	Multan Sikandar
Arshad Nadeem	Raider	Sahiwal Bulls
Sohail Akhtar	Raider	Islamabad All Stars
Bilal Irshad	Raider	Gwadar Bahadurs
Imran Butt	Raider	Karachi Zorawar
Mohsin Ali	Raider	Kashmir Janbaaz
Sajjad Gujjar	Left-cover (Defender)	Faisalabad Sherdils
Irfan Malik	Right-corner (Defender)	Peshawar Haiders
Asif Niazi	Right-cover (Defender)	Lahore Thunder
Amir Nawaz	Left-corner (Defender)	Gujrat Warriors
Usman Warraich	Right-corner (Defender)	Karachi Zorawar
Taimoor Khan	Right-cover (Defender)	Kashmir Janbaaz
Naveed Ashraf	Left-cover (Defender)	Multan Sikandar

== Coaching staff ==
Position	Name
Head coach	(Pakistan) Badshah Gul
Assistant coach	(Pakistan) (Not publicly detailed)
Coaching staff (additional)	Pakistan Kabaddi Federation staff

== International grounds ==
Locations of stadiums which have hosted international kabaddi matches in Pakistan

Stadium	City	Province	Capacity	Matches hosted	Notes
Punjab Stadium, Pakistan	Lahore	Punjab	10,000	Kabaddi World Cup, international friendlies	Main kabaddi venue in Pakistan; hosted multiple editions of Kabaddi World Cup (circle style)
Iqbal Stadium	Faisalabad	Punjab	18,000	National finals, exhibition matches	Originally a cricket venue; occasionally used for outdoor kabaddi events
Nishtar Park Sports Complex	Lahore	Punjab	5,000	Asian Kabaddi Championship, training camps	Multi-sport facility with indoor kabaddi arrangements

== Friendly Tournament records ==
=== Circle Style Kabaddi ===
This style of game introduced in Pakistan in 1956 Pakistan participate in the below mentioned competitions

- Pak Vs India Kabaddi Series 1956, India (Gold)
- Canada Kabaddi Cup 1981, Canada (Silver)
- Pak Vs India Kabaddi Series 1982 Lahore, Pakistan (Gold)
- Pak Vs India Kabaddi Series 1983 Lahore, Pakistan (Silver)
- Pak Vs India Kabaddi Series 1984 Lahore, Pakistan (Gold)
- Prime Minister International Gold Cup 1997, Pakistan (Gold)
- Pak Vs India Kabaddi Series 1998, India (Silver)
- Prime Minister International Gold Cup 1999, Pakistan (Gold)
- Pak Vs India Kabaddi Series 2002, India (Silver)
- Indo-Pak Games 2004 Patyala, India (Silver)
- Takkar Kabaddi Series 2008 Pakistan afaad (Silver)
- Pak Vs India Kabaddi Series 2009, India (Silver)
- International Kabaddi Tournament 2009 Kharian, Pakistan (Gold)
- Kabaddi Premier League 2013, Dubai (Gold)
- International Kabaddi Cup 2013 UK (Bronze)
- 37th International Kabaddi Championship 2014 POF Wah (Gold)

== Notable players ==
- Nasir Ali
- Wajid Ali
- Waseem Sajjad
- Muhammad Khalid
- Muhammad Arshad
- Ibrar Hussain
- Abrar Khan
- Maqsood Ali
- Abdul Mukhtar
- Atif Waheed
- Akhlaq Hussain
- Muhammad Ali
- Shafiq Ahmed Chishti
- Ali Warraich

== See also ==
- Kabaddi at the Asian Games
- Pakistan Kabaddi Federation
