= Peshawar Haiders =

Kabafdi club in the Super Kabaddi League

- PH
- Nickname: Zamung Team

Personnel
- Captain: Akhlaq Hussain
- Owner: Digital Entertainment World, Classic broadcasters, Afghan TV

Team information
- City: Peshawar, Khyber Pakhtunkhwa, Pakistan
- Colors: Purple, blue
- Founded: 2018

Peshawar Haiders (PH) is a Kabaddi club based in Peshawar, Pakistan that plays in the Super Kabaddi League. The team is currently led by Akhlaq Hussain.

== Franchise history ==
Super Kabaddi League (SKL) is a professional Kabaddi league in Pakistan, based on the format of the group games and eliminator. The first edition of the tournament was played in 2018 with ten franchises representing various cities in Pakistan.

Peshawar Haiders also has a dedicated following in Afghanistan.

== Current squad ==
No.	Name	Nation	Birth date	Position
2	Akhlaq Hussain (C)	(Pakistan)	26 May 1988 (age 38)	All-Rounder
11	Usman Zada	(Pakistan)	7 August 1992 (age 34)	Raider
20	Usman Khalid	(Pakistan)	7 October 1995 (age 30)	Raider
23	Subhan Aslam	(Pakistan)	17 September 1998 (age 28)	Raider
9	Qaiser Abbass	(Pakistan)	5 May 1991 (age 35)	Raider
4	Imran Ali	(Pakistan)	10 May 1992 (age 34)	Raider
1	M. Yousuf	(Pakistan)	5 April 1997 (age 29)	Raider
27	M. Yasin	(Pakistan)	20 April 1986 (age 40)	Raider
22	Abdul Rehman	(Pakistan)	1 January 1999 (age 27)	Raider
3	Milad Sherhak	(Iran)	9 May 1982 (age 44)	All Rounder

== See also ==
- Super Kabaddi League
- Pakistan national kabaddi team
- Pakistan Kabaddi Federation
