= Lahore Thunder =

- LT

Personnel
- Captain: Mudassar Shah
- Owner: Ali Akbar Group, Sayban Group, Tara Group

Team information
- City: Lahore, Punjab, Pakistan
- Colors: Orange and Blue
- Founded: 2018

Lahore Thunder (LT) is a Kabaddi club based in Lahore, Pakistan that plays in the Super Kabaddi League. The team is currently led by Mudassar Shah.

== Franchise history ==
Super Kabaddi League (SKL) is a professional Kabaddi league in Pakistan, based on the format of the group games and eliminator. The first edition of the tournament was played in 2018 with ten franchises representing various cities in Pakistan.

The SKL has a dedicated following in Punjab and in countries such as a Canada among Pakistani, particularly Punjabi, diaspora.

== Current squad ==
No.	Name	Nation	Birth date	Position
2	Mudassar Shah (C)	(Pakistan)	4 January 1997 (age 29)	All-Rounder
11	M. Sufyan	(Pakistan)	7 August 1992 (age 33)	Raider
20	Ahsan Mehmood	(Pakistan)	7 October 1995 (age 30)	Raider
23	Atif Sohail	(Pakistan)	17 September 1998 (age 27)	Raider
9	M. Afzal	(Pakistan)	5 May 1991 (age 34)	Raider
4	M. Ali	(Pakistan)	10 May 1992 (age 33)	Raider
1	M. Mujahid	(Pakistan)	5 April 1997 (age 28)	Raider
27	M. Abid	(Pakistan)	20 April 1986 (age 39)	Raider
22	Mazhar Iqbal	(Pakistan)	1 January 1999 (age 27)	Raider
3	Murtaza Jamaladerah	(Iran)	9 May 1982 (age 43)	All Rounder

== See also ==
- Super Kabaddi League
- Pakistan national kabaddi team
- Pakistan Kabaddi Federation
