= Dubai Kabaddi Masters =

6 nation Kabaddi Masters series

Tournament information
- Dates: 22 June–30 June
- Administrator: International Kabaddi Federation
- Format: Standard style
- Tournament format(s): Double Round-robin and Knockout
- Host: United Arab Emirates
- Venue: 1
- Participants: 6

Final positions
- Champions: India
- 1st runners-up: Iran
- 2nd runners-up: Pakistan; South Korea

Tournament statistics
- Matches played: 15

The Dubai Kabaddi Masters was a 6 nation Kabaddi Masters series which was held in the United Arab Emirates for 9 days from 22 June 2018 – 30 June 2018. This was also the inaugural edition of the tournament. This was the first international kabaddi sport event to be witnessed in the UAE. The tournament featured defending world champions India, Pakistan, Iran, Republic of Korea, Argentina and Kenya. India was regarded as the firm favourites to lift the inaugural Dubai Kabaddi Masters title. The tournament was hosted at the Al Wasl Sports Club in Dubai.

The opening encounter of the tournament was held between arch rivals India and Pakistan, the first rivalry match between these two teams since the 2016 Kabaddi World cup. India scored against Pakistan 36–20 in the opening match.

Before the commencement of the opening match of the tournament on 22 June Friday, the Pakistan team was scheduled to be arrived on 21 June, Thursday but their arrival to Dubai was delayed due to visa issues. The Indian Kabaddi team also played a warm-up match against their Asian rivals South Korea as a preparation to the tournament.

The current Indian Union sports minister and former professional shooter, Rajyavardhan Singh Rathore invited as the chief guest on the eve of the opening clash between India and Pakistan.

The inaugural edition of the Dubai Kabaddi Masters was organised by the International Kabaddi Federation affiliating along with the Dubai Sports Council and with Star India network. The broadcast rights were offered to Star India and the series was telecast through the Star Sports Network.

India defeated Iran 44–26 in the final to clinch the inaugural edition of the Dubai Kabaddi Masters tournament.

== Format ==
The six teams are divided into 2 groups of 3 teams. The teams in a group plays each other twice with the top two teams from each group qualifying for the knockout stages (semi-finals).

== Group A ==
Team	Pld	W	D	L	SF	SA	SD	Pts
India	4	4	0	0	175	71	+104	20
Pakistan	4	2	0	2	122	118	+4	10
Kenya	4	0	0	4	75	183	-108	0

Qualified for semi-finals
Eliminated

report

== Group B ==
Team	Pld	W	D	L	SF	SA	SD	Pts
Iran	4	4	0	0	177	98	+79	20
South Korea	4	2	0	2	173	107	+66	11
Argentina	4	0	0	4	92	237	-145	0

Qualified for semi-finals
Eliminated

report

== Schedule ==
=== 1st Match ===
22 June 2018
18:30

India	36-20	Pakistan
	report

Al Wasl Sports Club

=== 2nd Match ===
22 June 2018
19:30

Iran	35-20	South Korea
	report

Al Wasl Sports Club

=== 3rd Match ===
23 June 2018
18:30

Iran	54-24	Argentina
	report

Al Wasl Sports Club

=== 4th Match ===
23 June 2018
19:30

India	48-19	Kenya
	report

Al Wasl Sports Club

=== 5th Match ===
24 June 2018
18:30

South Korea	72-16	Argentina
	report

Al Wasl Sports Club

=== 6th Match ===
24 June 2018
19:30

Pakistan	43-21	Kenya
	report

Al Wasl Sports Club

=== 7th Match ===
25 June 2018
18:30

Iran	31-27	South Korea
	report

Al Wasl Sports Club

=== 8th Match ===
25 June 2018
19:30

India	41-17	Pakistan
	report

Al Wasl Sports Club

=== 9th Match ===
26 June 2018
18:30

Iran	57-27	Argentina
	report

Al Wasl Sports Club

=== 10th Match ===
26 June 2018
20:50

India	50-15	Kenya
	report

Al Wasl Sports Club

=== 11th Match ===
27 June 2018
18:30

South Korea	54-25	Argentina
	report

Al Wasl Sports Club

=== 12th Match ===
27 June 2018
19:30

Pakistan	42-20	Kenya
	report

Al Wasl Sports Club

== Knockout stage ==
Semi-finals
B1	Iran	67
A2	Pakistan	11
A1	India	29
B2	South Korea	22

Final
SF1	Iran	26
SF2	India	44

=== Semi-final ===
29 June 2018
18:30

Iran	67-11	Pakistan
	report

Al Wasl Sports Club

29 June 2018
19:30

India	29-22	South Korea
	report

Al Wasl Sports Club

=== Final ===
30 June 2018

Iran	26-44	India
	report

Al Wasl Sports Club

== Statistics ==
=== Top Raiders ===
- Lee Jang-kun - 40 points
- Ajay Thakur - 34 points
- Rishank Devadiga - 28 points
- Pardeep Narwal - 24 points
- Rahul Chaudhari - 17 points

=== Top Defenders ===
- Girish Ernak - 19 points
- Young Chang Ko - 16 points
- Surjeet Singh Narwal - 15 points

== See also ==
- Kabaddi at the 2018 Asian Games – Men's tournament
- Kabaddi at the 2018 Asian Games – Women's tournament
