= Sahiwal Bulls =

Pakistani sports club

- SB

Personnel
- Captain: Hassan Ali
- Owner: Alvi Electronics Lahore

Team information
- City: Sahiwal, Punjab, Pakistan
- Colors: Orange and Navy Blue
- Founded: 2018

Sahiwal Bulls (SB) is a Kabaddi club based in Sahiwal, Pakistan that plays in the Super Kabaddi League. The team is currently led by Hassan Ali.

== Franchise history ==
Super Kabaddi League (SKL) is a professional Kabaddi league in Pakistan, based on the format of the group games and eliminator. The first edition of the tournament was played in 2018 with ten franchises representing various cities in Pakistan.

The SKL has a dedicated following in Punjab and Canada.

== Current squad ==
No.	Name	Nation	Birth date	Position
2	Hassan Ali (C)	(Pakistan)	26 May 1988 (age 37)	All-Rounder
11	Waqas Ali	(Pakistan)	7 August 1992 (age 33)	All-Rounder
20	Amir Mahmood	(Pakistan)	7 October 1995 (age 30)	All-Rounder
23	Afzal Ali	(Pakistan)	17 September 1998 (age 27)	All-Rounder
9	Abid Hussain	(Pakistan)	5 May 1991 (age 34)	All-Rounder
4	Sajjad Shoukat	(Pakistan)	10 May 1992 (age 33)	Raider
1	M. Faizan Riaz	(Pakistan)	5 April 1997 (age 28)	All-Rounder
27	Rafique	(Pakistan)	20 April 1986 (age 39)	All-Rounder
22	M. Nisar	(Pakistan)	1 January 1999 (age 27)	Raider
3	Sabuj	(Bangladesh)	9 May 1982 (age 43)	Defender

== See also ==
- Super Kabaddi League
- Pakistan national kabaddi team
- Pakistan Kabaddi Federation
