= Iran national kabaddi team =

Representatives of Islamic Republic of Iran in kabaddi

Iran
- Association: Kabaddi Federation of I.R. Iran
- Confederation: Asian Kabaddi Federation (AKF)
- Head Coach: Navab Tazehqaleh
- Captain: Fazel Atrachali
- Most caps: Fazel Atrachali (188)

World Cup
- 3 (first in 2004)
- (silver) 2nd (2004, 2007, 2016)

Asian Games
- 6 (first in 2006)
- (gold) 1st (2018)

Asian Championship
- 5 (first in 2002)
- (gold) 1st (2003)
Medal record
Event	1st	2nd	3rd
World Cup	0	3	0
Circle World Cup	0	0	2
Asian Games	1	4	0
Asian Championship	1	1	3
Asian Indoor Games	0	2	1
Asian Beach Games	3	0	1
World Beach Championship	1	0	0
Circle Asia Cup	0	0	3
Dubai Kabaddi Masters	0	1	0
Total	6	11	10
World Cup
Silver medal – second place	2004 India	
Silver medal – second place	2007 India	
Silver medal – second place	2016 India	
Circle World Cup
Bronze medal – third place	2014 India	
Bronze medal – third place	2020 Pakistan	
Asian Games
Gold medal – first place	2018 Jakarta	
Silver medal – second place	2010 Guangzhou	
Silver medal – second place	2014 Incheon	
Silver medal – second place	2022 Hangzhou	
Silver medal – second place	2026 Aichi–Nagoya	
Asian Championship
Gold medal – first place	2003 Malaysia	
Silver medal – second place	2023 South Korea	
Bronze medal – third place	2002 Malaysia	
Bronze medal – third place	2005 Iran	
Bronze medal – third place	2017 Iran	
Asian Indoor Games
Silver medal – second place	2009 Hanoi	
Silver medal – second place	2013 Incheon	
Bronze medal – third place	2007 Macau	
Asian Beach Games
Gold medal – first place	2012 Haiyang	
Gold medal – first place	2014 Phuket	
Gold medal – first place	2026 Sanya	
Bronze medal – third place	2010 Muscat	
World Beach Championship
Gold medal – first place	2024 Iran	
Circle Asia Cup
Bronze medal – third place	2011 Iran	
Bronze medal – third place	2012 Pakistan	
Bronze medal – third place	2016 Pakistan	
Dubai Kabaddi Masters
Silver medal – second place	2018 Dubai	

The Iran men's national kabaddi team represents the Islamic Republic of Iran in international men's kabaddi competitions. Governed by the Kabaddi Federation of I.R. Iran, it is the only side other than India to have won the men's gold medal at the Asian Games, doing so in 2018 after beating India in the semi-final, and it has finished runners-up in 2010, 2014, 2022 and 2026. Iran was runners-up to India in all three standard-style Kabaddi World Cup editions (2004, 2007 and 2016).

The team has also won the Asian Kabaddi Championship (2003), the Asian Beach Games (2012, 2014 and 2026) and the inaugural World Beach Kabaddi Championship (2024). In April 2026 Iran beat India 44–31 in the final of the beach kabaddi event at the 2026 Asian Beach Games in Sanya. Fazel Atrachali captains the side.

== History ==
=== Early years (2002–2017) ===
Iran first entered the Asian Kabaddi Championship in 2002, finishing third, and won the title in 2003 in Malaysia; it took third place again in 2005, when the championship was hosted in Iran, and in 2017. Iran was runners-up to India in the first three standard-style World Cups in 2004, 2007 and 2016. The team entered the 2006 Asian Games in Doha, finishing fourth, and won silver at the 2010 and 2014 Asian Games, both times losing to India in the final.

=== Asian Games champions (2018) ===
At the 2018 Asian Games in Jakarta, Iran won all seven of its matches, including a 27–18 semi-final win over India, and took its first Asian Games gold in kabaddi, leaving India with bronze. Iran took silver at the 2022 Asian Games in Hangzhou, losing 33–29 to India in the final. Iran hosted the inaugural World Beach Kabaddi Championship in 2024 and won it.

=== Recent years (2026–present) ===
In April 2026 Iran won the men's beach kabaddi title at the 2026 Asian Beach Games in Sanya, beating India 44–31 in the final. For the 2026 Asian Games in Aichi–Nagoya Navab Tazehqaleh was appointed head coach, replacing Gholamreza Mazandarani, who had led the team from 2006 to 2023 and now coaches the women's team. Iran, captained by Fazel Atrachali, topped Group B with four wins, beating Nepal 76–23, Malaysia 67–33, Thailand 83–27 and Pakistan 51–30, which eliminated Pakistan from medal contention for the first time in its Asian Games history. Iran then beat Chinese Taipei 59–21 in the semi-final and lost the final to India 40–34 on 26 September to take silver.

== Tournament records ==
*Red border indicates that the tournament was hosted on home soil. Gold, silver, bronze backgrounds indicate 1st, 2nd and 3rd finishes respectively. Bold text indicates best finish in tournament.

=== Standard kabaddi ===
==== World Cup ====
Year	Rank	Pld	W	D	L
(India) 2004	**Runners-up**	5	4	0	1
(India) 2007	**Runners-up**	6	5	0	1
(India) 2016	**Runners-up**	7	5	0	2
Total	3/3	18	14	0	4

==== Asian Games ====
Year	Rank	M	W	D	L	PF	PA	PD
(China) 1990	Did not enter							
(Japan) 1994	Did not enter							
(Thailand) 1998	Did not enter							
(South Korea) 2002	Did not enter							
(Qatar) 2006	Fourth place	5	1	1	3	148	183	-35
(China) 2010	**Runners-up**	4	2	0	2	116	113	+3
(South Korea) 2014	**Runners-up**	5	4	0	1	200	106	+94
(Indonesia) 2018	**Champions**	7	7	0	0	342	143	+199
(China) 2022	**Runners-up**	5	4	0	1	236	115	+121
(Japan) 2026	**Runners-up**	6	5	0	1	370	174	+196
Total	6/10	32	23	1	8	1412	834	+578

==== Asian Kabaddi Championship ====
Year	Rank
1980 to 2001	Did not enter
(Malaysia) 2002	**Third place**
(Malaysia) 2003	**Champions**
(Iran) 2005	**Third place**
(Iran) 2017	**Third place**
(South Korea) 2023	**Runners-up**
Total	5/11

==== Dubai Kabaddi Masters ====
Year	Rank	Pld	W	D	L
(United Arab Emirates) 2018	**Runners-up**	6	5	0	1
Total	1/1	6	5	0	1

=== Beach kabaddi ===
==== World Championship ====
Year	Rank	Pld	W	D	L
(Iran) 2024	**Champions**	6	6	0	0
Total	1/1	6	6	0	0

==== Asian Beach Games ====
Year	Rank	M	W	D	L	PF	PA	PD
(Indonesia) 2008	Did not enter							
(Oman) 2010	**Third place**	5	3	0	2	237	168	+69
(China) 2012	**Champions**	4	4	0	0	179	115	+64
(Thailand) 2014	**Champions**	5	5	0	0	217	152	+65
(Vietnam) 2016	Did not enter							
(China) 2026	**Champions**	5	5	0	0	224	150	+74
Total	4/6	19	17	0	2	857	585	+272

=== Indoor kabaddi ===
==== Asian Indoor and Martial Arts Games ====
Year	Rank	M	W	D	L	PF	PA	PD
(Macau) 2007	**Third place**	6	4	0	2	249	114	+135
(Vietnam) 2009	**Runners-up**	5	4	0	1	293	148	+145
(South Korea) 2013	**Runners-up**	6	4	0	2	276	189	+87
Total	3/3	17	12	0	5	818	451	+367

=== Circle kabaddi ===
==== Circle World Cup ====
Year	Rank	Pld	W	D	L
(India) 2010	Round 1	4	0	0	4
(India) 2011	Did not enter				
(India) 2012	Fourth place	5	3	0	2
(India) 2013	Did not enter				
(India) 2014	**Third place**	6	4	0	2
(India) 2016	Fourth place	7	5	0	2
(Pakistan) 2020	**Third place**	6	4	0	2
Total	5/7	28	16	0	12

==== Circle Asian Cup ====
Year	Rank	M	W	D	L	PF	PA	PD
(Iran) 2011	**Third place**	4	2	0	2	-	-	-
(Pakistan) 2012	**Third place**	5	3	0	2	176	128	+48
(Pakistan) 2016	**Third place**	5	3	0	2	304	171	+133
Total	3/3	14	8	0	6	480	299	+181

== Recent results and fixtures ==
=== Recent results ===
Event	Dates	Venue	Result
Asian Games	21–26 September 2026	Aichi–Nagoya, Japan	Runners-up (beat Chinese Taipei 59–21 in semi-final; lost to India 40–34 in final)
Asian Beach Games	April 2026	Sanya, China	Champions (beat India 44–31 in final)

=== 2026 Asian Games results ===
Date	Round	Opponent	Score
22 September 2026	Group B	Nepal	76–23
23 September 2026	Group B	Malaysia	67–33
24 September 2026	Group B	Thailand	83–27
24 September 2026	Group B	Pakistan	51–30
25 September 2026	Semi-final	Chinese Taipei	59–21
26 September 2026	Final	India	34–40

=== Upcoming schedule ===
Event	Dates	Venue
Asian Indoor and Martial Arts Games	28 March – 8 April 2027 (postponed from December 2026)	Riyadh, Saudi Arabia

== Current squad ==
The following 12 players represented Iran at the 2026 Asian Games, where the team won silver. Fazel Atrachali was the captain.

Player	Role
Fazel Atrachali (Captain)	Defender
Mohammadreza Shadloui	All-rounder
Mohammad Esmaeil Nabibakhsh	All-rounder
Reza Mirbagheri	
Alireza Mirzaeian	
Amir Mohammad Zafardanesh	
Amir Hossein Bastami	
Amir Hossein Ejlali	
Ali Samadi	
Omid Khojasteh	
Amir Hossein Taghipour	
Amir Reza Aliakbari	

=== Former players ===
The following players appeared in an earlier listing of the squad but were not in the 2026 Asian Games roster.

- Meraj Sheykh
- Abolfazl Maghsoudlou
- Gholamabbas Korouki
- Mohammadesmaeil Maghsoudlou Mahalli
- Mohammadtaghi Paeinmahali
- Mohsen Maghsoudloujafari
- Abozar Mohajer Mighani
- Hadi Tajik
- Milad Sheibak
- Soleiman Pahlevani
- Hadi Oshtorak
- Farhad Rahimi Milaghardan
- Saeid Ghaffari
- Mohammed Sajith Afridi

== Coaching staff ==
Position	Name
Head coach	(Iran) Navab Tazehqaleh

== International grounds ==
Locations of stadiums which have hosted international kabaddi matches in Iran

Stadium	City	Province	Capacity	Matches hosted	Notes
Azadi Indoor Stadium	Tehran	Tehran Province	6,000	Asian Kabaddi Championship, international matches	Major indoor venue for kabaddi and other indoor sports in Iran
Shohada-ye Haftom-e Tir Stadium	Tehran	Tehran Province	3,000	National team training, friendly matches	Frequently used for training and exhibition kabaddi matches

== Honours ==
=== World ===
- World Cup – Standard style:
  - Runners-up (3): 2004, 2007, 2016
- World Cup – Circle style:
  - Third place (2): 2014, 2020
- World Beach Kabaddi Championship:
  - Champions (1): 2024

=== Asia ===
- Asian Games:
  - Gold Medal (1): 2018
  - Silver Medal (4): 2010, 2014, 2022, 2026
- Asian Kabaddi Championship:
  - Champions (1): 2003
  - Runners-up (1): 2023
  - Third place (3): 2002, 2005, 2017
- Asian Indoor Games:
  - Silver Medal (2): 2009, 2013
  - Bronze Medal (1): 2007
- Asian Beach Games:
  - Gold Medal (3): 2012, 2014, 2026
  - Bronze Medal (1): 2010
- Circle Asia Cup:
  - Third place (3): 2011, 2012, 2016

=== Other tournaments ===
- Dubai Kabaddi Masters:
  - Runners-up (1): 2018

== See also ==
- Sport in Iran
- Iran women's national kabaddi team
- India men's national kabaddi team
