= Super Kabaddi League =

Super Kabaddi League (SKL)
- Country: Pakistan
- Administrator: Strawberry Sports Management Pakistan Kabaddi Federation
- First tournament: 2018
- Tournament format: Multistage with Group games, followed by Eliminators and Playoffs
- Number of teams: 10
- Current champions: Gujrat Warriors
- Most successful: Gujrat Warriors
- Most raid points: Nasir Ali (68 points)
- TV partner(s): PTV Sports

Super Kabaddi League (SKL) is a professional-level kabaddi league in Pakistan. Its inaugural season was played from 1 to 10 May 2018 in Lahore. This league follows a city-based franchise model. More than a 100 Kabaddi players from Pakistan and abroad were presented in the players' draft, which took place on 23 April 2018 in Lahore. International players from Sri Lanka, Iran, Bangladesh and Malaysia participated in the inaugural edition.

== Draft ==
Drafting of the inaugural season took place on 23 April 2018, with each of the ten franchises given an opportunity to pick a roster of 10 players, which included 2 Platinum, 7 Gold and 1 Foreign player pick.

== Opening ceremony ==
The formal opening ceremony of the league took place on 1 May 2018 at Alhamra Cultural Complex in Lahore. Film actress-cum-director/producer Reema Khan was the host of the opening ceremony. Singers Nabeel Shaukat Ali and Sara Raza Khan performed during the ceremony.

This was the first time that a Kabaddi-related event of such a scale had been organised in the country.

The event was open for all to attend. It was attended by people from all walks of life as well team owners, officials of the Pakistan Kabaddi Federation and many others. The ceremony included several performances, which included Bakhshi Brothers, who also sang one of the songs for Season 1.

== Teams and locations ==
Cities represented by SKL teams as of 2018

Team	City	Province
Faisalabad Sherdils	Faisalabad	Punjab
Gujrat Warriors	Gujrat	Punjab
Gwadar Bahadurs	Gwadar	Balochistan
Islamabad All Stars	Islamabad	Islamabad Capital Territory
Karachi Zorawar	Karachi	Sindh
Kashmir Janbaaz	Muzaffarabad	Azad Kashmir
Lahore Thunder	Lahore	Punjab
Multan Sikandar	Multan	Punjab
Peshawar Haiders	Peshawar	Khyber Pakthunkhwa
Sahiwal Bulls	Sahiwal	Punjab

== Broadcast ==
SKL was broadcast live on television. The broadcast partner was PTV Sports. In addition to the live telecast, the matches were shown on repeat the following day as well.

== Final ==
Gujrat Warriors won the inaugural Super Kabaddi League after defeating Faisalabad Sherdils in the final game by 38-26. Gujrat Warriors' Tehseen Ullah was declared the Man of the Final. Faisalabad's captain Nasir Ali was declared the Player of the League. The winning team received a Rs. 1 million cash prize while the runners-up were given Rs. 500,000.

== See also ==
- Pakistan national kabaddi team
