= Germany national kabaddi team =

Germany
- Nickname(s): The Kabaddi Eagles
- Association: Germany Kabaddi Federation
- Confederation: International Kabaddi Federation (IKF)

World Cup
- 1 (first in 2004)
- Group Stage (2004)

Circle World Cup
- 2 (first in 2025)
- Group Stage (2011, 2020)

European Championship
- 1 (first in 2023)
- 3rd (2023)
Medal record
Event	1st	2nd	3rd
European Championship	0	0	1
Total	0	0	1

The Germany national kabaddi team represents Germany in international kabaddi competitions and is governed by the Germany Kabaddi Federation, affiliated with the International Kabaddi Federation (IKF). Germany is among several European nations that have participated in both World and European kabaddi tournaments.

== History ==
=== 2020 Kabaddi World Cup ===
Germany made its international kabaddi debut at the 2020 Kabaddi World Cup held in Pakistan. The team competed in Pool A, where they notably defeated England by 49–28. Despite two group-stage wins, Germany did not advance to the knockout rounds.

=== 2023 European Championship ===
Germany participated in the 6th Open European Kabaddi Championship held on 9 July 2023 in Verdello, Italy. The event featured both men’s and women’s teams across standard and circle styles. Germany was one of over 15 nations involved, including Poland, England, Italy, and Belgium.

== Tournament history ==
=== Standard kabaddi ===
==== World Cup (IKF) ====
World Cup
Year	Rank	M	W	D	L	PF	PA	PD
(India) 2004	Group stage	3	1	0	2	62	85	−23
(India) 2007	Didn’t Participate							
(India) 2016	Didn’t Participate							
(India) 2025	TBD							
Total	1/3	3	1	0	2	62	85	−23

==== World Cup (World Kabaddi) ====
Kabaddi World Cup
Year	Rank	M	W	D	L	PF	PA	PD
(Malaysia) 2019	Didn’t Participate							
(England) 2025	Didn’t Participate							
Total	0/3	-	-	-	-	-	-	-

=== Kabaddi World Cup (Circle Style) ===
Kabaddi World Cup (circle style)
Year	Rank	M	W	D	L	PF	PA	PD
(India) 2010	Didn’t Participate							
(India) 2011	Group stage	4	–	–	–	–	–	–
(India) 2012	Didn’t Participate							
(India) 2013	Didn’t Participate							
(India) 2014	Didn’t Participate							
(India) 2016	Didn’t Participate							
(Pakistan) 2020	Group stage	4	2	0	2	–	–	–
Total	2/8	4	2	0	2	–	–	–

==== European Kabaddi Championship ====
European Kabaddi Championship
Year	Rank	M	W	D	L	PF	PA	PD
(Scotland) 2019	Didn’t Participate							
(Cyprus) 2021	Didn’t Participate							
(Italy) 2023	Third place	4	2	0	2	105	97	+8
Total	1/3	4	2	0	2	105	97	+8

Germany made their debut in the European Kabaddi Championship in 2023 held in Verdello, Italy, where they finished in third place. They did not participate in the 2019 or 2021 editions.

== International grounds ==
Locations of stadiums which have hosted international kabaddi matches in Germany

Stadium	City	State	Capacity	Matches hosted	Notes
Uber Arena	Berlin	Berlin	3,500	European Kabaddi Championship, exhibition matches	Regular venue for kabaddi events; hosted men's and women's European kabaddi games
Messe München	Munich	Bavaria	5,000	Friendly matches, kabaddi demonstrations	Multi-purpose exhibition and event venue; used for promotional kabaddi events

== Performance record ==
=== Kabaddi World Cup (Circle Style) ===
- **2020** – Group Stage (1W, 2L)

=== European Kabaddi Championship ===
- **2023 (Verdello)** – Third place

== Governance ==
Germany is a full member of the International Kabaddi Federation (IKF) and is part of the developing European kabaddi community.

== See also ==
- International Kabaddi Federation
- European Kabaddi Championship
- Kabaddi World Cup (circle style)
