= Ashan Kumar =

Indian kabaddi player

Ashan kumar
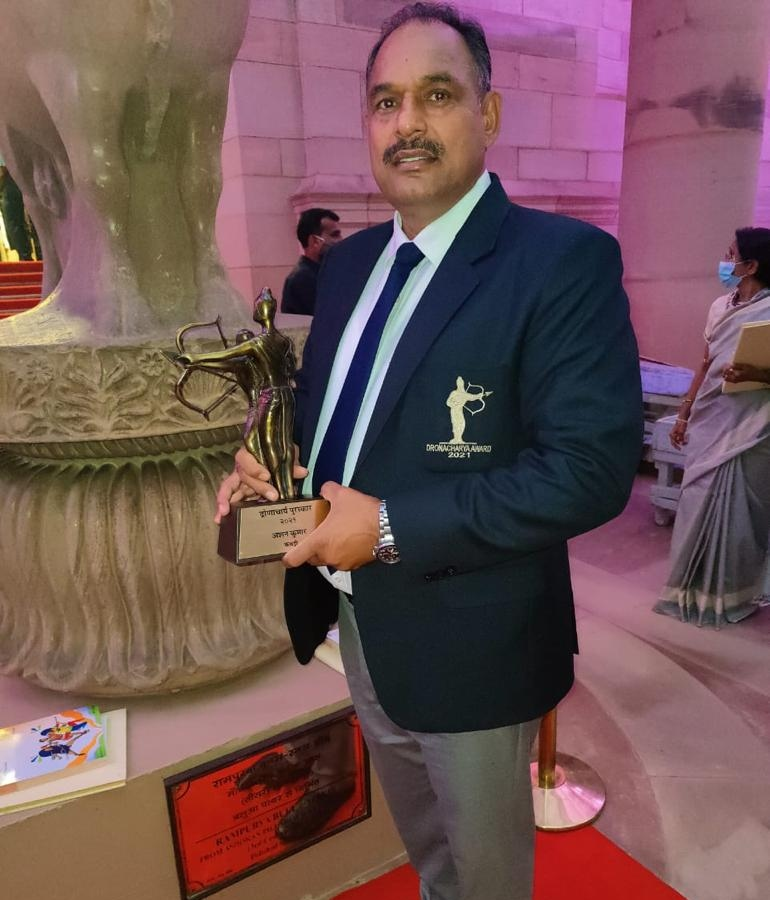
- Ashan Kumar, 2022

Personal information
- Nickname: "Silent killer" Legend in Kabaddi
- Nationality: Indian
- Born: Bhera village, Bhiwani, Haryana , India
- Height: 1.80 m (5 ft 11 in)
- Weight: 78 kg (172 lb)

Sport
- Country: India
- Sport: Kabaddi
- Position: All Rounder
- League: Pro Kabaddi League
- Team: India
Medal record
Men's Kabaddi
Representing India
Asian Games
Gold medal – first place	1990 Beijing	Team

Ashan Kumar Sangwan is a former Indian professional Kabaddi player and Coach of Tamil Thalaivas. Kumar was the Indian captain of the first Asian Games gold medal-winning team.in recognition of his achievements in the sport, he was awarded the Arjuna Award by the Government of India and Dronacharya Award in 2021. Presently he is the coach of the Indian Kabaddi team.

== Early life ==
Ashan Kumar was born on 15 April 1960, Bhera village, in the Bhiwani district of Haryana. He took up Kabaddi during his school days. After having played for his school team, he represented India at the first Asian games as a captain in 1990.

== Career ==
The Indian Kabaddi team under Kumar's captaincy won the gold medal in the Asian Games in 1990. At the 64th Kabaddi Senior Nationals, Ashan Kumar was the coach of the Haryana squad, who advanced to the tournament's semifinals. He received the prestigious Arjuna Award from the then-President of India in 1999, the Bhim Award from the governor of Haryana in 1994, and the Bharat Gaurav Award from the president of the AKFI in 1993.As a coach, Ashan Sangwan has been the coach of India in 1998 in his coaching team India won gold medal in bangkok.In 2010, he was coach of the Iran team that competed and won silver at Guangzhou. He was also coach of South Korea in 2018. Kumar is currently the head coach of Tamil Thalaivas in the Pro Kabaddi League, as well as the coach of the Indian Kabaddi team.
