= 2020 Kabaddi World Cup (circle style) =

International kabaddi tournament in Pakistan

Tournament information
- Dates: 9 February–16 February
- Administrator: Government of Punjab, Pakistan; Sports Board Punjab; Pakistan Kabaddi Federation
- Format: Circle style (Men)
- Tournament format(s): Round-robin and Knockout
- Host: Pakistan
- Venue: 3
- Participants: 9

Final positions
- Champions: Pakistan (1st title)
- 1st runners-up: India
- 2nd runners-up: Iran

The 2020 Kabaddi World Cup or 2020 Tapal Tezdum Kabbadi World Cup (for sponsorship reasons) was the seventh edition of the Kabaddi World Cup (circle style), held from 9 to 16 February 2020 with the opening ceremony on 9 February 2020 at the Punjab Stadium, Lahore, in Pakistan.

== Organization ==
The tournament was organized by the Government of Punjab, Sports Board Punjab and Pakistan Kabaddi Federation.

== Participating nations ==
The 8-day event had 9 participating nations in the tournament.

=== Teams ===
- Pakistan
- Canada
- England
- India (unauthorized)
- Iran
- Sierra Leone
- Australia
- Azerbaijan
- Germany
- Kenya (Did not Participate)

== Venues ==
The games were played at the following venues.

- Punjab Stadium, Lahore
- Iqbal Stadium, Faisalabad
- Zahoor Elahi Stadium, Gujrat

== Promotion in media ==
This World Cup was promoted on social media by the hashtag #ApniMittiApnaKhel (lit. Our Soil, Our Game).

=== Ceremonies ===
The opening ceremony took take place at the Punjab Stadium in Lahore, prior to the first match of the 2020 Kabaddi World Cup between Pakistan and Canada.

== Pool Points ==
Result	Points
Win	2 points
Draw	1 point
Loss	0 point

== Group Stage Pools ==
=== Pool A ===
Team	Pld	W	D	L	SF	SA	SD	Pts
Pakistan	4	4	0	0	166	78	+88	8
Australia	3	2	0	1	126	123	+3	4
Canada	3	1	0	2	100	143	-43	2
Azerbaijan	3	0	0	3	85	133	-48	0
Kenya (W)	0	0	0	0	0	0	0	0

Top 2 qualified for semifinals

==== Pool B ====
Team	Pld	W	D	L	SF	SA	SD	Pts
India	4	4	0	0	107	46	+61	8
Iran	4	3	0	1	211	118	+93	6
Germany	4	2	0	2	143	180	-37	4
England	4	1	0	3	122	176	-54	2
Sierra Leone	4	0	0	4	77	188	-111	0

Top 2 qualified for semifinals

== Fixtures ==
Note: All matches' timings are according to Pakistan Standard Time (UTC +5:00).

9 February 2020
18:30

Pakistan	64 – 23	Canada

Punjab Stadium, Lahore

9 February 2020
20:00

Iran	60 – 19	Sierra Leone

Punjab Stadium, Lahore

10 February 2020
15:00

India	62 – 28	Germany

Punjab Stadium, Lahore

10 February 2020
18:00

Iran	57 – 26	England

Punjab Stadium, Lahore

10 February 2020
19:30

Australia	48 – 37	Canada

Punjab Stadium, Lahore

11 February 2020
15:30

Australia	53 – 24	Azerbaijan

Punjab Stadium, Lahore

11 February 2020
16:45

Germany	49 – 28	England

Punjab Stadium, Lahore

11 February 2020
18:00

India	45 – 18	Sierra Leone

Punjab Stadium, Lahore

12 February 2020
13:30

Canada	40 – 31	Azerbaijan

Iqbal Stadium, Faisalabad

12 February 2020
16:45

Iran	55 – 23	Germany

Iqbal Stadium, Faisalabad

12 February 2020
14:45

England	40 – 26	Sierra Leone

Iqbal Stadium, Faisalabad

13 February 2020
15:30

Germany	43 – 14	Sierra Leone

Iqbal Stadium, Faisalabad

13 February 2020
19:30

Pakistan	62 – 25	Australia

Iqbal Stadium, Faisalabad

14 February 2020
14:30

Pakistan	40 – 30	Azerbaijan

Zahoor Elahi Stadium, Gujrat

== Knockout stage ==
15 February 2020
19:30

Pakistan	52 – 30	Iran

Punjab Stadium, Lahore

15 February 2020
18:00

India	42 - 31	Australia

Punjab Stadium, Lahore

== Third-Place Match ==
16 February 2020
16:00

Iran	54 – 33	Australia

Punjab Stadium, Lahore

== Final ==
16 February 2020
19:00

Pakistan	43-41	India

Punjab Stadium, Lahore

== Broadcasting ==
Television

Countries	Broadcaster
Pakistan	Geo Super
India	PTC News
United Kingdom; European Union	PTC Punjabi
Online Web Streaming	BSports Pakistan

== Sponsorships ==
Tapal Tezdam (Main)
Other Sponsors
Jang	Engro	Homage	Trans Group
QMobile	Pepsi	Aspire	Mughal Steel

== See also ==
- Kabaddi World Cup (Circle style)
- Kabaddi World Cup (Standard style)
