= Dubai Japanese School =

Japanese school in the United Arab Emirates

- ドバイ日本人学校 المدرسة اليابانية في دبي

Location
- Al Wasl - Dubai - United Arab Emirates

Information
- Type: International school
- Established: 1980; 46 years ago
- Website: www.japanese.sch.ae

The Dubai Japanese School (DJS) or Japanese School in Dubai (ドバイ日本人学校, Dobai Nihonjin Gakkō; Arabic: المدرسة اليابانية في دبي) is a Japanese curriculum school located in the Al Wasl area in Dubai. The Northern Association of Japanese Community established the school in 1980. The school is in proximity of Jumeira Beach. The pink-colored building is adjacent to the Modern High School campus.

Fumiyoshi Suzuki, the principal, stated in 2009 that almost all graduates of his school go back to Japan to go to high school.
