= 2004 Kabaddi World Cup (International Kabaddi Federation) =

International kabaddi tournament in India

Tournament information
- Dates: 19 November–21 November
- Administrator: South Kanara Sports Club, under Amateur Kabaddi Federation of India; Recognised by International Kabaddi Federation
- Format: Standard style
- Tournament format(s): Round-robin and Knockout
- Host: India
- Venue(s): Mumbai, Maharashtra
- Participants: 12

Final positions
- Champions: India (1st title)
- 1st runners-up: Iran
- 2nd runners-up: Bangladesh; Canada

Tournament statistics
- Matches played: 23

2004 Kabaddi World Cup was the first ever Kabaddi World Cup recognised by the International Kabaddi Federation (IKF). It was organised by South Kanara Sports Club, under Amateur Kabaddi Federation of India in India. Hosts India won the title defeating Iran 55–27 in the final.

== Teams ==
With last minute withdrawal of Pakistan and Afghanistan, 12 teams competed in the tournament.

- ~~Afghanistan~~
- Bangladesh
- Canada
- Germany
- India
- Iran
- Japan
- Malaysia
- Nepal
- ~~Pakistan~~
- South Korea
- Thailand
- United Kingdom
- West Indies

== Pools ==
The teams were divided into three pools of four teams each.

| Pool A | Pool B | Pool C |
|---|---|---|
| India; Canada; Thailand; West Indies | Japan; Malaysia; South Korea; United Kingdom | Bangladesh; Germany; Iran; Nepal |

== Competition format ==
Twelve teams competed in tournament consisting of two rounds. In the first round, teams were divided into three pools of four teams each, and followed round-robin format with each of the team playing all other teams in the pool once. Following the completion of the league matches, teams placed first and second in each pool advanced to a single elimination round consisting of four quarterfinals, two semifinal games, and a final.

== Schedule ==
All matches' timings were according to Indian Standard Time (UTC +5:30).

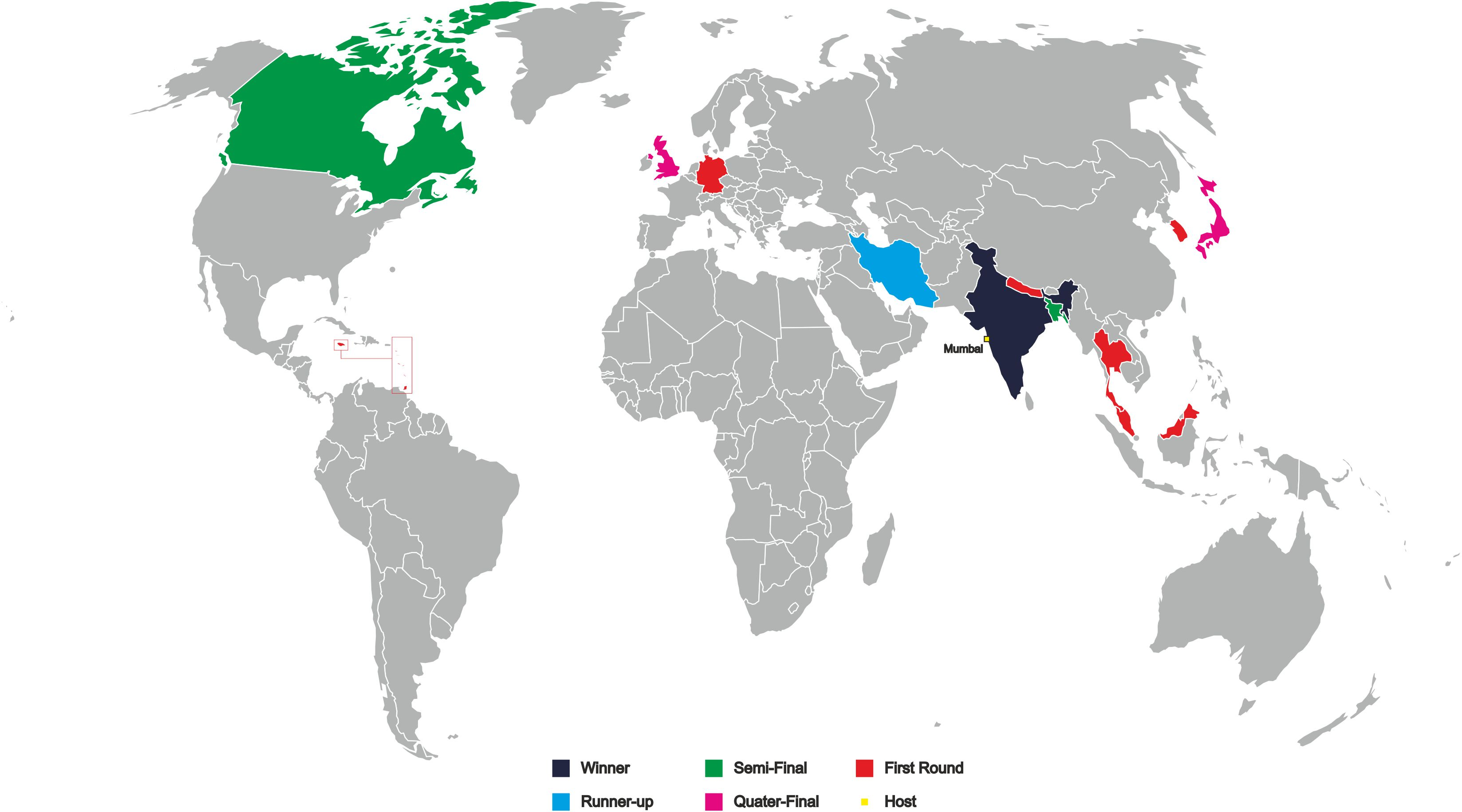

=== Group stage ===
==== Pool A ====
| Team | Pld | W | D | L | SF | SA | SD | Pts | Qualification |
|---|---|---|---|---|---|---|---|---|---|
| India | 3 | 3 | 0 | 0 | 162 | 85 | 77 | 6 | Advance to knockout phase |
| Canada | 3 | 2 | 0 | 1 | 161 | 90 | 71 | 4 | Advance to knockout phase |
| Thailand | 3 | 1 | 0 | 2 | 122 | 131 | -9 | 2 | |
| West Indies | 3 | 0 | 0 | 3 | 77 | 216 | -139 | 0 | |

19 November 2004

| Canada | 93 – 09 (HT: 52 – 03) | West Indies |

Mumbai, Maharashtra

19 November 2004

| Thailand | 63 – 26 (HT: 39 – 06) | West Indies |

Mumbai, Maharashtra

19 November 2004

| India | 51 – 14 (HT: 31 – 07) | Canada |

Mumbai, Maharashtra

20 November 2004

| India | 60 – 42 (HT: 36 – 23) | West Indies |

Mumbai, Maharashtra

20 November 2004

| Canada | 54 – 30 (HT: 26 – 18) | Thailand |

Mumbai, Maharashtra

20 November 2004

| India | 51 – 29 (HT: 33 – 14) | Thailand |

Mumbai, Maharashtra

==== Pool B ====
| Team | Pld | W | D | L | SF | SA | SD | Pts | Qualification |
|---|---|---|---|---|---|---|---|---|---|
| Japan | 3 | 3 | 0 | 0 | 165 | 70 | 95 | 6 | Advance to knockout phase |
| United Kingdom | 3 | 2 | 0 | 1 | 142 | 142 | 0 | 4 | Advance to knockout phase |
| South Korea | 3 | 1 | 0 | 2 | 135 | 130 | 5 | 2 | |
| Malaysia | 3 | 0 | 0 | 3 | 85 | 184 | -99 | 0 | |

19 November 2004

| United Kingdom | 60 – 37 (HT: 34 – 19) | Malaysia |

Mumbai, Maharashtra

19 November 2004

| Japan | 43 – 28 (HT: 25 – 06) | South Korea |

Mumbai, Maharashtra

19 November 2004

| United Kingdom | 54 – 49 (HT: 30 – 17) | South Korea |

Mumbai, Maharashtra

20 November 2004

| Japan | 66 – 14 (HT: 25 – 07) | Malaysia |

Mumbai, Maharashtra

20 November 2004

| Japan | 56 – 28 (HT: 30 – 13) | United Kingdom |

Mumbai, Maharashtra

20 November 2004

| South Korea | 58 – 34 (HT: 28 – 17) | Malaysia |

Mumbai, Maharashtra

==== Pool C ====
| Team | Pld | W | D | L | SF | SA | SD | Pts | Qualification |
|---|---|---|---|---|---|---|---|---|---|
| Iran | 3 | 3 | 0 | 0 | 204 | 84 | 120 | 6 | Advance to knockout phase |
| Bangladesh | 3 | 2 | 0 | 1 | 204 | 93 | 111 | 4 | Advance to knockout phase |
| Nepal | 3 | 1 | 0 | 2 | 125 | 140 | -15 | 2 | |
| Germany | 3 | 0 | 0 | 3 | 73 | 281 | -208 | 0 | |

19 November 2004

| Nepal | 78 – 19 (HT: 52 – 07) | Germany |

Mumbai, Maharashtra

19 November 2004

| Iran | 53 – 41 (HT: 35 – 17) | Bangladesh |

Mumbai, Maharashtra

19 November 2004

| Iran | 96 – 19 (HT: 56 – 13) | Germany |

Mumbai, Maharashtra

20 November 2004

| Bangladesh | 56 – 23 (HT: 35 – 10) | Nepal |

Mumbai, Maharashtra

20 November 2004

| Iran | 65 – 24 (HT: 28 – 12) | Nepal |

Mumbai, Maharashtra

20 November 2004

| Bangladesh | 107 – 35 (HT: 67 – 17) | Germany |

Mumbai, Maharashtra

=== Knockout stage ===
Quarter-finals
21 November
India | Bye
21 November
Japan | 24
Bangladesh | 33
21 November
Canada | 66
United Kingdom | 28
21 November
Iran | Bye

Semi-finals
21 November
India | 39
Bangladesh | 19
21 November
Canada | 28
Iran | 54

Final
21 November
India | 55
Iran | 27

==== Quarter-finals ====
21 November 2004

| Japan | 24 – 33 (HT: 11 – 12) | Bangladesh |

Mumbai, Maharashtra

21 November 2004

| Canada | 66 – 28 (HT: 32 – 11) | United Kingdom |

Mumbai, Maharashtra

==== Semi-finals ====
21 November 2004

| India | 39 – 19 (HT: 12 – 05) | Bangladesh |

Mumbai, Maharashtra

21 November 2004

| Canada | 28 – 54 (HT: 09 – 31) | Iran |

Mumbai, Maharashtra

==== Final ====
21 November 2004

| India | 56 – 28 (HT: 27-12) | Iran |

Chennai, Tamilnadu

2004 Kabaddi World Cup
| Champions | 1st Runners-up | 2nd Runners-up | |
| India (1st Title) | Iran | Bangladesh | Canada |
