= Faisalabad Sherdils =

Kabaddi club in Faisalabad, Pakistan

- FS

Personnel
- Captain: Nasir Ali
- Owner: Fatima Fertilizer Company Limited

Team information
- City: Faisalabad, Punjab, Pakistan
- Colors: Green and Black
- Founded: 2018

Faisalabad Sherdils (FS) is a Kabaddi club based in Faisalabad, Pakistan that plays in the Super Kabaddi League (SKL). The team is currently led by Nasir Ali, who also holds the record for the most raid points in the inaugural SKL season in 2018.

== Franchise history ==
Super Kabaddi League is a professional Kabaddi league in Pakistan, based on the format of the group games and eliminator. The first edition of the tournament was played in 2018 with ten franchises representing various cities in Pakistan.

SKL has a dedicated following in Punjab and Canada.

== Current squad ==
No.	Name	Nation	Birth date	Position
2	Nasir Ali (C)	(Pakistan)	26 May 1988 (age 37)	All-rounder
11	M. Azam Shah	(Pakistan)	7 August 1992 (age 33)	All-rounder
20	Haiser Ali	(Pakistan)	7 October 1995 (age 30)	All-rounder
23	Ahmed Raza	(Pakistan)	17 September 1998 (age 27)	All-rounder
9	Wasim Akram	(Pakistan)	5 May 1991 (age 34)	All-rounder
4	Abrar Khan	(Pakistan)	10 May 1992 (age 33)	All-rounder
1	Rashid Mehboob	(Pakistan)	5 April 1997 (age 28)	All-rounder
27	Sharafat Ali	(Pakistan)	20 April 1986 (age 39)	All-rounder
22	Abid Hussain	(Pakistan)	1 January 1999 (age 27)	All-rounder
3	Ranidu Chamara	(Sri Lanka)	9 May 1982 (age 43)	Defender

== See also ==
- Super Kabaddi League
- Pakistan national kabaddi team
- Pakistan Kabaddi Federation
