= Al Wasl, Dubai =

Al Wasl الوصل
- Community
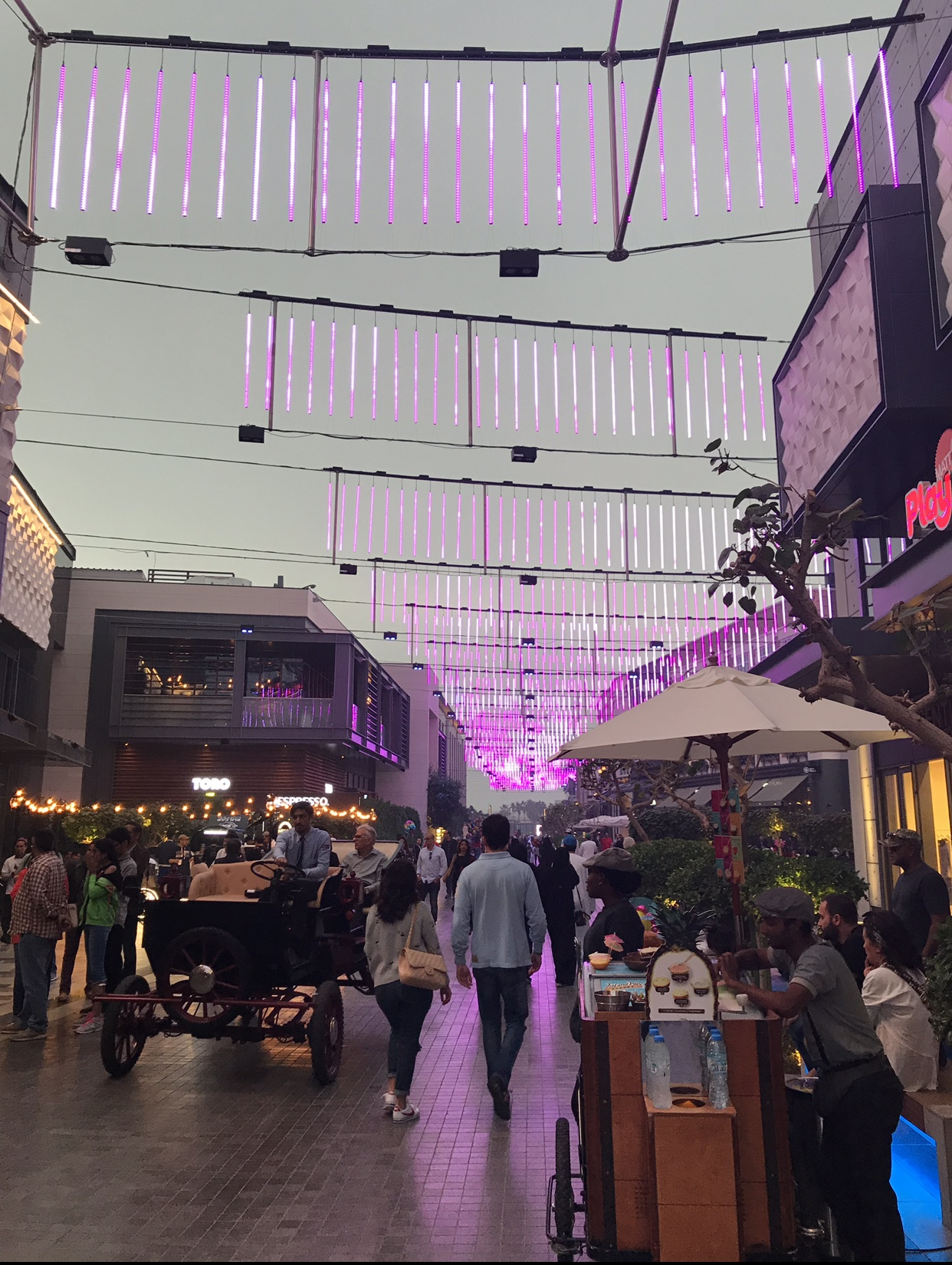
- City Walk, Al Wasl, Dubai
- Interactive map of Al Wasl
- Coordinates: 25.19640°N 55.25488°E
- Country: United Arab Emirates
- Emirate: Dubai
- City: Dubai

Area
  - Total: 4.76 km^{2} (1.84 sq mi)

Population (2000)
  - Total: 22,153
  - Density: 4,650/km^{2} (12,100/sq mi)
- Community number: 343

Al Wasl (Arabic: الوصل) is a locality in Dubai, United Arab Emirates (UAE). The locality is located in western Dubai, between the first and second interchanges of route E 11 (Sheikh Zayed Road). Al Wasl is a residential community and is bordered to the north by Jumeirah, to the south by Business Bay, to west by Al Safa and to the east by Al Satwa.

The population of Al Wasl is 10,736 as the population estimation at the end of 2017.

The locality gets its name from a historic British reference to the city of Dubai. Important landmarks in the locality include the publishing offices of Gulf News and Al Bayan, Al Mazaya Centre and Safa Park.

== Education ==
The Dubai Japanese School is in Al Wasl.
