= Kabaddi at the 1990 Asian Games =

Asian Games

- Venue: Teachers College of Physical Education
- Dates: 23–28 September 1990
- Nations: 6

Kabaddi was contested by six teams at the 1990 Asian Games in Beijing, China from September 23 to September 28 at the Teachers College of Physical Education.

India won the gold medal in a round robin competition.

== Medalists ==
Event	Gold	Silver	Bronze
Men	India; Raju Bhavsar; Krishan Kumar Godara; Anil Kumar; Ashan Kumar; Tirath Raj; S. Rajarathinam; Ashok Shinde; Hardeep Singh; Randhir Singh	Bangladesh; Nazir Ahmed; Shah Alam; Amjad Hossain; Rabiul Islam; Tariqul Islam; Abul Qasem	Pakistan; Nisar Ahmed; Pervaiz Ahmed; Muhammad Farooq; Muhammad Hussain; Mubashir Iqbal; Muhammad Mansha; Sultan Mehmood; Talat Mehmood; Abdul Razaq; Muhammad Sarwar; Rana Saif Ullah; Tahir Waheed

== Results ==
Pos	Team	Pld	W	D	L	PF	PA	PD	Pts
1	India	5	5	0	0	234	84	+150	10
2	Bangladesh	5	3	1	1	116	121	−5	7 (Note: Second place play-off match: BAN 19–18 PAK)
3	Pakistan	5	3	1	1	116	112	+4	7
4	China	5	1	0	4	89	148	−59	2
4	Japan	5	1	0	4	84	130	−46	2
4	Nepal	5	1	0	4	97	141	−44	2

Notes:

23 September

Pakistan	26–14	Japan

Teachers College of Physical Education, Beijing

23 September

Bangladesh	23–19	Nepal

Teachers College of Physical Education, Beijing

23 September

China	15–46	India

Teachers College of Physical Education, Beijing

24 September

Nepal	21–43	India

Teachers College of Physical Education, Beijing

24 September

Pakistan	23–23	Bangladesh

Teachers College of Physical Education, Beijing

24 September

China	17–20	Japan

Teachers College of Physical Education, Beijing

25 September

China	12–35	Bangladesh

Teachers College of Physical Education, Beijing

25 September

India	45–18	Japan

Teachers College of Physical Education, Beijing

25 September

Nepal	16–24	Pakistan

Teachers College of Physical Education, Beijing

27 September

India	48–13	Pakistan

Teachers College of Physical Education, Beijing

27 September

Nepal	17–34	China

Teachers College of Physical Education, Beijing

27 September

Japan	15–18	Bangladesh

Teachers College of Physical Education, Beijing

28 September

Japan	17–24	Nepal

Teachers College of Physical Education, Beijing

28 September

China	11–30	Pakistan

Teachers College of Physical Education, Beijing

28 September

India	52–17	Bangladesh

Teachers College of Physical Education, Beijing

- Since both Pakistan and Bangladesh were tied on points, a play-off game was played to decide the 2nd team.

28 September

Pakistan	18–19	Bangladesh

Teachers College of Physical Education, Beijing

== Final standing ==
Rank	Team	Pld	W	D	L
1st place, gold medalist(s)	India	5	5	0	0
2nd place, silver medalist(s)	Bangladesh	6	4	1	1
3rd place, bronze medalist(s)	Pakistan	6	3	1	2
4	China	5	1	0	4
4	Japan	5	1	0	4
4	Nepal	5	1	0	4
