= Punjab Stadium, Pakistan =

Sports venue in Lahore, Pakistan

Punjab Stadium
- ورزشگاه پنجاب
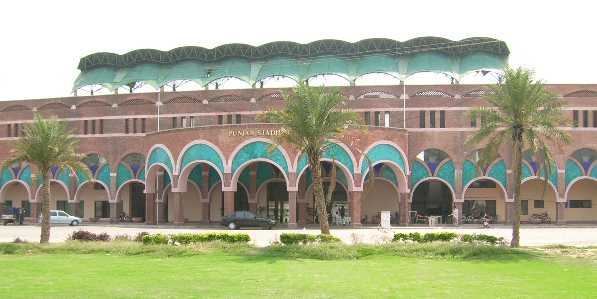
- Interactive map of Punjab Stadium
- Location: Hafeez Kardar Road, Lahore, Pakistan
- Coordinates: 31°30′39″N 74°19′55″E
- Owner: Punjab Sports Board
- Operator: Punjab Sports Board
- Capacity: 10,000
- Surface: Grass

Construction
- Opened: 3 January 2003
- Renovated: 20 July 2026 - 2027
- Expanded: Under renovation stadium

Tenant
- Pakistan national football team (2005–present)

The Punjab Stadium is a multi-purpose stadium in Lahore, Pakistan. It is currently used mostly for football matches and serves as one of the home venues for the Pakistan national football team. The stadium has a capacity of around 10,000 spectators. It is owned and operated by the Punjab Sports Board. The stadium is part of the Nishtar Park Sports Complex which houses several facilities for all other major sports and includes the National Hockey Stadium.

== History ==
=== Early years ===
The construction of the multi-purpose stadium started in 1999 aimed to host the National Games of Pakistan. The Government of Punjab gave Rs 110 million for the project to the Lahore Development Authority before the start of the work. After failure to complete the stadium before the commencement of the National Games, the project received several extensions until the venue finally hosted the Punjab Games in 2003.

=== Home of Pakistan football ===
Apart from being one of the main venues of several national sports events such as the National Games of Pakistan or football events such as the Pakistan Premier League, PFF League, PFF National Challenge Cup and the National Women Football Championship, the stadium has been a regular home venue for the Pakistan national football team since the 2000s.

In June 2005, it hosted its first international football match, where Pakistan won against India by 3–0. In 2006, the stadium hosted Pakistan's Asian Cup qualifier match against Jordan. The next year, it hosted 13 of the 15 matches of the AFC President's Cup. In October 2007, it hosted the first leg of Pakistan's FIFA World Cup qualifier against Iraq.

On 1 March 2011, the stadium hosted a friendly match against Palestine, which the hosts lost by 2–1. Eight days later, it hosted the second leg of the Pakistan under-23 team during the Olympic football Asian qualifiers against Malaysia, which ended 0-0. 7,000 spectators attended the match. Four months later, on 3 July 2011, it hosted the second leg of Pakistan's World Cup qualifier against Bangladesh, which ended in a goalless draw.

In May 2012, it hosted all Group A fixtures of the 2012 AFC President's Cup. As part of the Punjab International Sports Festival, the stadium hosted the Chief Minister Punjab International Football Cup 2012 in November, which was won by Serbian club FK Bor. On 12 October 2014, it hosted a friendly against Palestine, which Pakistan lost 2–0. A few months later, on 6 February 2015, it hosted another friendly against Afghanistan, which Pakistan won 2–1.

After years of inactivity due to the ban on Pakistan Football Federation by FIFA, and after 11 years since Pakistan ever held an international football event, the stadium was considered as one of the potential venues for the 2026 FIFA World Cup qualification on 17 October 2023. However, the qualifier was eventually played at Jinnah Sports Stadium in Islamabad after Punjab Stadium was deemed to be falling short of FIFA standards.

== Hosting history ==
=== Football events ===
- 2007 AFC President's Cup
- 2007 AFC Asian Cup qualification
- 2010 FIFA World Cup qualification
- 2012 Summer Olympics qualification
- 2012 AFC President's Cup
- 2014 FIFA World Cup qualification
- 2027 South Asian Games (proposed)

=== Rugby events ===
- 2014 Asia Rugby Championship
- 2022 Asia Rugby Championship
- 2023 Asia Rugby Championship

=== Kabaddi events ===
- 2012 Asia Kabaddi Cup (circle style)
- 2020 Kabaddi World Cup (circle style)

In addition to these events, Punjab Stadium has been a venue for various national sports competitions and cultural festivals.

== See also ==
- List of stadiums in Pakistan
- List of sports venues in Lahore
