= Kabaddi World Cup (circle style) =

International kabaddi competition

- Sport: Circle style kabaddi
- Founded: 2010; 16 years ago
- First season: 2010
- Administrator: Government of Punjab, India; Government of Punjab, Pakistan
- No. of teams: 12
- Region: International
- Most recent champions: M: Pakistan (1st title); W: India (3rd title)
- Most titles: M: India (6 titles); W: India (3 titles)

The circle style Kabaddi World Cup was an international kabaddi competition administered by the Government of Punjab (India) and Government of Punjab (Pakistan) contested by men's and women's national teams. The competition has been contested every year from the inaugural tournament in 2010 to 2016, except for 2015 due to the 2015 Guru Granth Sahib desecration controversy, and then in 2020. The women's tournament was introduced in 2013. Every tournament, men's and women's, has been won by India except the 2020 edition, which was played in Pakistan and won by Pakistan.

== Cultural performances ==
In opening and closing ceremonies of the Kabaddi World Cup, there are performances by Punjabi artists of India and Pakistan.

== Format ==
The current format of the competition involves a round robin group stage, with 4 teams in 2 pools, first and second of the each group progress to the semi-finals.

== Summary ==
Men

Year	Host	Final			Third place match		
Year	Host	Winner	Score	Runner-up	3rd place	Score	4th place
2010	(India); Ludhiana	India	58–24	Pakistan	Canada	66–22	Italy
2011	(India); Ludhiana	India	59–25	Canada	Pakistan	60–22	Italy
2012	(India); Ludhiana	India	59–22	Pakistan	Canada	51–35	Iran
2013	(India); Ludhiana	India	48–39	Pakistan	United States	62–27	England
2014	(India); Sri Muktsar Sahib	India	45–42	Pakistan	Iran	48–31	England
2016	(India); Jalalabad, Fazilka	India	62–20	England	United States	43–39	Iran
2020	(Pakistan); Lahore, Faisalabad, Gujrat	Pakistan	43–41	India	Iran	54–33	Australia

Women

Year	Host	Final			Third place match		
Year	Host	Winner	Score	Runner-up	3rd place	Score	4th place
2013	(India); Ludhiana	India	49–21	New Zealand	Denmark	34–33	Pakistan
2014	(India); Sri Muktsar Sahib	India	36–27	New Zealand	Pakistan	38–28	Denmark
2016	(India); Jalalabad, Fazilka	India	45–10	United States	New Zealand	42–21	Kenya

== Medal table ==
Men

Rank	Nation	Gold	Silver	Bronze	Total
1	India	6	1	0	7
2	Pakistan	1	4	1	6
3	Canada	0	1	2	3
4	England	0	1	0	1
5	Iran	0	0	2	2
5	United States	0	0	2	2
Totals (6 entries)		7	7	7	21

Women

Rank	Nation	Gold	Silver	Bronze	Total
1	India	3	0	0	3
2	New Zealand	0	2	1	3
3	United States	0	1	0	1
4	Denmark	0	0	1	1
4	Pakistan	0	0	1	1
Totals (5 entries)		3	3	3	9
