= Nepal national kabaddi team =

National kabaddi team of Nepal

Nepal
- Association: All Nepal Kabaddi Association
- Confederation: Asian Kabaddi Federation (AKF)
- Head Coach: Bishnu Datta Bhatta
- Captain: Ghanshyam Roka Magar

World Cup
- 2 (first in 2004)
- Quarter-finals (2007)

Asian Games
- 5 (first in 1990)
- 4th (1990)

Asian Championship
- 5 (first in 1980)
- (bronze) 3rd (1980)
Medal record
Event	1st	2nd	3rd
Asian Championship	0	0	1
South Asian Games	0	0	1
Total	0	0	2
Asian Championship
Bronze medal – third place	1980 India	
South Asian Games
Bronze medal – third place	2010 Dhaka	

The Nepal men's national kabaddi team represents Nepal in international men's kabaddi competitions. The team is governed by the All Nepal Kabaddi Association (ANKA) and is affiliated with the Asian Kabaddi Federation (AKF). Nepal has played at five Asian Games, most recently in 2026, with fourth place in 1990 its best finish.

== History and achievements ==
The team first played at the 1990 Asian Games in Beijing, where it finished fourth, and returned in 1994 and 1998 before missing the next several editions; it played again at the 2018 Asian Games in Jakarta, finishing ninth. Nepal has also competed in the Asian Kabaddi Championship since 1980, taking third place in its debut year, and has played in the World Cup twice, first in 2004, reaching the quarter-finals in 2007.

At the South Asian Games, Nepal won a bronze medal in 2010 in Dhaka, the country's first kabaddi medal at the Games since the sport was introduced in 1985. As hosts of the 2019 Games Nepal was eliminated in the group stage after a 54–22 loss to Pakistan.

In February and March 2025 Nepal played a five-match series in Bangladesh, losing 4–1 but winning the second match, its first win over Bangladesh; captain Ghanshyam Roka Magar was named best raider of the series.

At the 2026 Asian Games in Aichi–Nagoya, Nepal, captained by Ghanshyam Roka Magar for the first time at the Games and coached by Bishnu Datta Bhatta, prepared with a camp in Haryana, India. In Group B it lost 48–59 to Thailand, 43–58 to Pakistan and 23–76 to Iran, and beat Malaysia 73–52 on the last day. Nepal finished fourth in the group with one win and three defeats and did not reach the semi-finals.

== Tournament records ==
=== Asian Games ===
Year	Rank	M	W	D	L	PF	PA	PD
(China) 1990	4th							
(Japan) 1994	5th							
(Thailand) 1998	7th							
(South Korea) 2002	Did not enter							
(Qatar) 2006	Did not enter							
(China) 2010	Did not enter							
(South Korea) 2014	Did not enter							
(Indonesia) 2018	9th							
(China) 2022	Did not enter							
(Japan) 2026	7th	4	1	0	3	187	245	-58

=== Asian Kabaddi Championship ===
Year	Rank
(India) 1980	Third place

=== World Cup ===
Year	Rank
(India) 2004	
(India) 2007	Quarter-finals

=== South Asian Games ===
Year	Host city	Position
2010	Dhaka, Bangladesh	Third place

== Recent results ==
=== Recent results ===
Event	Dates	Venue	Result
Asian Games	21–26 September 2026	Aichi–Nagoya, Japan	Group stage (4th in Group B)

=== 2026 Asian Games results ===
Date	Round	Opponent	Score
21 September 2026	Group B	Thailand	48–59
22 September 2026	Group B	Pakistan	43–58
22 September 2026	Group B	Iran	23–76
24 September 2026	Group B	Malaysia	73–52

== Current squad ==
The following 12 players were named for the 2026 Asian Games.

Name	Role
Ghanshyam Roka Magar (captain)	Raider
Anku Pun	
Aditya Chaudhary	
Prakash Giri	
Suraj Bohara	
Sanskar Kumar	
Ravi Tharu	
Ashok Joshi	
Sagar Yadav	
Kumar Lama	
Ganesh Parki	
Karan Rasaili	

=== Former players ===
The following players appeared in an earlier listing of the squad but were not named for the 2026 Asian Games.

- Nageshor Tharu
- Kalyan Bhujel
- Lal Mohar Yadav
- Binod Tamang
- Bandhu Rana
- Ramu Tamata
- Pradip Mijar
- Ranjit Gajmer
- Prabin Khadka
- Bishal Thapa
- Sushil Chunara

== Coaching staff ==
Position	Name
Head coach	(Nepal) Bishnu Datta Bhatta
Assistant coach	(Nepal) Kalyan Bhujel
Team manager	(Nepal) Parshuram Oli
