= Pakistan Kabaddi Federation =

Pakistani sports governing body

- Sport: Kabaddi
- Abbreviation: PKF
- Founded: 1964
- Affiliation: International Kabaddi Federation
- Regional affiliation: Asian Kabaddi Federation
- Headquarters: Islamabad
- Location: Jinnah Stadium, Pakistan Sports Complex
- President: Shafay Hussain
- Secretary: Muhammad Sarwar Rana
- (Pakistan)

The Pakistan Kabaddi Federation (PKF) is the national governing body to develop and promote the sport of Kabaddi in Pakistan. The federation manages the Pakistan national kabaddi team.

== History ==
The federation is based in Islamabad where it was formed in 1964. It organized the first Pakistan Standard Style Kabaddi League, the Super Kabaddi League.

== Affiliations ==
The federation is affiliated with:

- International Kabaddi Federation
- Asian Kabaddi Federation
- Pakistan Sports Board
- Pakistan Olympic Association

== See also ==
- Pakistan national kabaddi team
- Super Kabaddi League
