= Kabaddi at the 2010 Asian Games – Men's tournament =

Men at the 2010 Asian Games
- Venue: Nansha Gymnasium
- Date: 22–26 November 2010
- Competitors: 79 from 7 nations

Medalists
gold medal	India
silver medal	Iran
bronze medal	Pakistan
bronze medal	Japan

Men's kabaddi at the 2010 Asian Games was held in Nansha Gymnasium, Guangzhou, China from 22 to 26 November 2010.

== Squads ==
Bangladesh	India	Iran	Japan
Mosharrof Hossain; Mozammal Haque; Abu Salah Musa; Bozlur Rashid; Md Rokonuzzaman; Faruk Hasan; Maftun Haque; Razu Ahmed; Aruduzzaman Munshi; Tipu Sultan; Mokterul Islam; Safikul Islam Matubber	Jasmer Singh; Samarjeet; Anup Kumar; Jeeva Kumar; Manjeet Chhillar; Sonu Narwal; Rakesh Kumar; Jasmer; Navneet Gautam; Kaptan Singh; Nitin Ghule; Jagdeep Singh	Reza Kamali Moghaddam; Morteza Shahidi; Nasser Roumiani; Fazel Atrachali; Meisam Abbasi; Mehdi Mousavi; Siamak Rezagholi; Abouzar Mohajer; Mehdi Safaeian; Kianoush Naderian; Ebad Dalili; Mostafa Nodehi	Kokei Ito; Hiromi Takahashi; Kazuhiro Takano; Terukazu Nitta; Kazuaki Murakami; Masayuki Ota; Ryota Nakajima; Ryokei Kushige; Yoji Kawai; Yudai Yamagishi; Taiki Nama; Masayuki Shimokawa
Malaysia	Pakistan	South Korea	
Jegankumar Balaraman; Jaya Prakash Panneer Selvam; Pokuneswaran Manium; Rubesh Manohran; Jeeva Muthusamy; Jaiprakash Narain Rajasegaran; Thiyagu Thangavelu; Jeevan Raman; Gabriel Johnson	Nasir Ali; Wajid Ali; Waseem Sajjad; Muhammad Khalid; Muhammad Arshad; Ibrar Hussain; Abrar Khan; Maqsood Ali; Abdul Mukhtar; Atif Waheed; Akhlaq Hussain; Muhammad Ali	Lee Jae-ho; Eom Tae-deok; Yang Young-mo; Heo Youn-chan; Im Woo-jeong; Kim Ki-dong; You Hong-seob; Jung Kwang-soo; Kim Seong-ryeol; Maeng Moo-sung	

== Results ==
All times are China Standard Time (UTC+08:00)

=== Preliminary round ===
==== Group A ====
Pos	Team	Pld	W	D	L	PF	PA	PD	Pts	Qualification
1	India	2	2	0	0	77	43	+34	4	Semifinals
2	Iran	2	1	0	1	79	60	+19	2	Semifinals
3	South Korea	2	0	0	2	39	92	−53	0	

Source: Results

22 November
15:00

Iran	55–20 (HT: 39–5)	South Korea

Nansha Gymnasium, Guangzhou

23 November
9:00

India	40–24 (HT: 29–13)	Iran

Nansha Gymnasium, Guangzhou

24 November
15:00

India	37–19 (HT: 19–10)	South Korea

Nansha Gymnasium, Guangzhou

==== Group B ====
Pos	Team	Pld	W	D	L	PF	PA	PD	Pts	Qualification
1	Pakistan	3	3	0	0	115	53	+62	6	Semifinals
2	Japan	3	2	0	1	74	58	+16	4	Semifinals
3	Bangladesh	3	1	0	2	76	89	−13	2	
4	Malaysia	3	0	0	3	82	147	−65	0	

Source: Results

22 November
16:00

Pakistan	51–27 (HT: 29–11)	Malaysia

Nansha Gymnasium, Guangzhou

22 November
17:00

Bangladesh	13–15 (HT: 5–6)	Japan

Nansha Gymnasium, Guangzhou

23 November
10:00

Bangladesh	48–38 (HT: 26–17)	Malaysia

Nansha Gymnasium, Guangzhou

23 November
11:00

Pakistan	28–11 (HT: 16–7)	Japan

Nansha Gymnasium, Guangzhou

24 November
16:00

Pakistan	36–15 (HT: 26–10)	Bangladesh

Nansha Gymnasium, Guangzhou

24 November
17:00

Malaysia	17–48 (HT: 7–26)	Japan

Nansha Gymnasium, Guangzhou

=== Knockout round ===
Semifinals
25 November
Pakistan	16
Iran	17
25 November
India	52
Japan	17

Final
26 November
Iran	20
India	37

==== Semifinals ====
25 November
9:00

Pakistan	16–17 (HT: 7–4)	Iran

Nansha Gymnasium, Guangzhou

25 November
10:00

India	52–17 (HT: 26–5)	Japan

Nansha Gymnasium, Guangzhou

==== Final ====
26 November
17:00

Iran	20–37 (HT: 3–24)	India

Nansha Gymnasium, Guangzhou

== Final standing ==
Rank	Team	Pld	W	D	L
1st place, gold medalist(s)	India	4	4	0	0
2nd place, silver medalist(s)	Iran	4	2	0	2
3rd place, bronze medalist(s)	Japan	4	2	0	2
3rd place, bronze medalist(s)	Pakistan	4	3	0	1
5	Bangladesh	3	1	0	2
5	South Korea	2	0	0	2
7	Malaysia	3	0	0	3
