= Bangladesh at the Asian Games =

- IOC code: BAN
- NOC: Bangladesh Olympic Association
- Medals Ranked 36th: Gold 1 Silver 5 Bronze 9 Total 15

Summer appearances
- 1978; 1982; 1986; 1990; 1994; 1998; 2002; 2006; 2010; 2014; 2018; 2022; 2026

Bangladesh first competed at the Asian Games in 1978 and won its first medal in 1986. Bangladesh has never taken part at the Asian Winter Games.

== Medal tables ==
=== List of medalists ===
Medal	Name	Games	Sport	Event
Bronze	Mosharraf Hossain	1986 Seoul	Boxing	Men's Light heavyweight
Silver	National team	1990 Beijing	Kabaddi	Men's Team
Silver	National team	1994 Hiroshima	Kabaddi	Men's Team
Bronze	National team	1998 Bangkok	Kabaddi	Men's Team
Silver	National team: Badsha Miah Jahidul Islam Deolwar Hossain Ziaur Rahman Rabiul Islam Mamun Al Tariqul Islam Kamal Hossain Bashir Ahmad Mollah Tauhidul Islam Enamul Haque Rezaul Islam	2002 Busan	Kabaddi	Men's Team
Bronze	National team: Md Mizanur Rahman Md Abdur Rouf Kazi Yunus Ahmed Mohammed Mozannal Haque Razu Ahmed Mosharrof Hossain Kamal Hossain Abul Kalam Badsha Miah Bozlur Rashid Ziaur Rahman Abu Salah Musa	2006 Doha	Kabaddi	Men's Team
Gold	National team: Mohammad Ashraful Shamsur Rahman Naeem Islam Faisal Hossain Shahadat Hossain Mahbubul Alam Nazmul Hossain Mohammed Nazimuddin Suhrawadi Shuvo Dolar Mahmud Mithun Ali Nasir Hossain Rony Talukdar Shuvagoto Hom Sabbir Rahman	2010 Guangzhou	Cricket	Men's Team
Silver	National team: Rumana Ahmed Salma Khatun Shohely Akhter Ayasha Rahman Chamely Khatun Tithy Sarkar Panna Ghosh Sultana Yesmin Lata Mondal Tazia Akhter Shukhtara Rahman Jahanara Alam Champa Chakma Shathira Jakir Farzana Hoque	2010 Guangzhou	Cricket	Women's Team
Bronze	National team: Hena Akhter Rupali Akhter Kazi Shahin Ara Arzana Akhter Baby Juni Chakma Shahnaz Parvin Maleka Kochi Rani Mondal Ismat Ara Nishi Maleka Parvin Fatema Akhter Poly Sharmin Sultana Rima Dolly Shefali	2010 Guangzhou	Kabaddi	Women's Team
Silver	National team: Rumana Ahmed Sharmin Akhter Shohaly Akther Jahanara Alam Panna Ghosh Farzana Hoque Sanjida Islam Fahima Khatun Salma Khatun Khadija Tul Kubra Lata Mondal Shahanaz Parvin Shukhtara Rahman Shaila Sharmin Nuzhat Tasnia	2014 Incheon	Cricket	Women's Team
Bronze	National team: Mashrafe Mortaza Taskin Ahmed Shakib Al Hasan Mithun Ali Mukhtar Ali Anamul Haque Shuvagata Hom Nasir Hossain Rubel Hossain Tamim Iqbal Imrul Kayes Mahmudullah Sabbir Rahman Shamsur Rahman Arafat Sunny	2014 Incheon	Cricket	Men's Team
Bronze	National team: Shahnaz Parvin Maleka Kazi Shahin Ara Sharmin Sultana Rima Farzana Akhter Baby Fatema Akhter Poly Juni Chakma Shila Akhter Rupali Akhter Suma Akhter Mita Khatun Tuktuki Akhter Azmira Khatun Dola	2014 Incheon	Kabaddi	Women's Team
Bronze	National team: Saif Hassan Afif Hossain Parvez Hossain Emon Zakir Hasan Jaker Ali Yasir Ali Mrittunjoy Chowdhury Rishad Hossain Shahadat Hossain Tanvir Islam Mahmudul Hasan Joy Sumon Khan Ripon Mondol Rakibul Hasan Nahid Rana Hasan Murad	2022 Hangzhou	Cricket	Men's Team
Bronze	National team: Marufa Akter Nahida Akter Shorna Akter Disha Biswas Fargana Hoque Rabeya Khan Fahima Khatun Sultana Khatun Sanjida Akter Meghla Lata Mondal Ritu Moni Sobhana Mostary Shathi Rani Nigar Sultana Shamima Sultana	2022 Hangzhou	Cricket	Women's Team
Bronze	Jinnat Akter	2026 Aichi–Nagoya	Wushu	Women’s Sanda 52kg

=== Medals by sport ===
Sport	Gold	Silver	Bronze	Total
Cricket	1	2	3	6
Kabaddi	0	3	4	7
Boxing	0	0	1	1
Wushu	0	0	1	1
Totals (4 entries)	1	5	9	15
