= Kabaddi in India =

Contact sport, native to the Indian subcontinent

- Country: India
- Governing body: Amateur Kabaddi Federation of India
- National teams: India men's national kabaddi team India women's national kabaddi team

Club competitions
- Pro Kabaddi League (2014–present)

Kabaddi, is a contact sport, native to the Indian subcontinent. It is one of the most popular sports in India, played mainly among village people. India has taken part in four Asian Games in kabaddi, and won gold in all.

Four forms of kabaddi played in India are Amar, Suranjeevi, huttuttoo, and Gaminee. Amar is generally played in Punjab, Haryana, the United States, Canada, and other parts of the world, mostly by Punjabi sportsmen. Suranjeevi is the most played form of kabaddi in India and the world. This is the form generally used in international matches and also the form used in the Asian Games. Huttuttoo is played by men in Maharashtra. In Gaminee style, seven players play on each side and a player that is put out has to remain out until all of his team members are out. The team that is successful in outing all of the players of the opponent's side secures a point. The game continues until five or seven points are secured. There is no fixed time duration.

== History and development ==
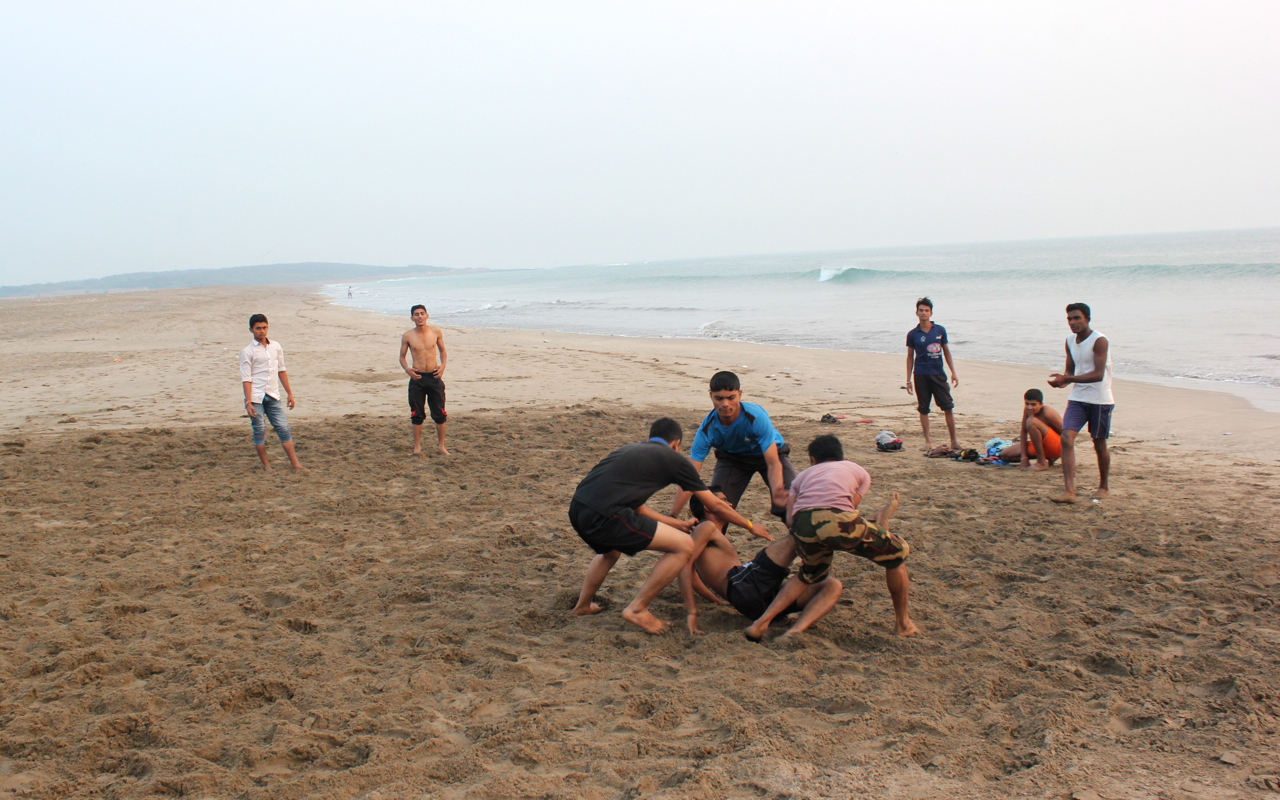
People playing Kabaddi at the Veraval beach, Gujarat

Kabaddi is a sport developed centered on Jallikattu. It was common among the Ayar tribal people who lived in the Mullai geographical region of ancient Tamil Nadu. A player going to the opposition is treated like a Bull. It is like taming a bull without touching it, as it is mentioned in Sangam Literature that the game Sadugudu was practiced for ages. There are also accounts of Gautam Buddha having played the game recreationally. There is another version to this sports origins and rich history, Legend has it that kabaddi originated in Tamil Nadu over 4,000 years ago.

The game was said to have been popular among the Yadava people. An Abhang by Tukaram stated that the lord Krishna played the game in his youth.

Modern kabaddi is a synthesis of the game played in various forms under different names. Kabaddi received international exposure during the 1936 Berlin Olympics. The game was introduced in the Indian Olympic Games at Calcutta in 1938.

In 1950 the All India Kabaddi Federation came into existence and compiled standard rules. The Amateur Kabaddi Federation of India (AKFI) was founded in 1973. After formation of the Amateur Kabaddi Federation of India, the first men's nationals were held in Tamil Nadu (Madras) (renamed Chennai), while the women's were in AKFI has given new shape to the rules.

The Asian Kabaddi Federation (AKF) was founded under the chairmanship of kabaddi.

In 1979, a return test between Bangladesh and India was held at different places of India including Mumbai, Hyderabad, and Punjab. The Asian Kabaddi Championship was arranged in 1980 and India emerged as champion and Bangladesh runner-up. Bangladesh became runner-up again in 1985 in the Asian Kabaddi Championship held in Jaipur, India. The other teams in the tournament were Nepal, Malaysia and Japan. The game was included for the first time in the Asian Games in Beijing in 1990. India, China, Japan, Malaysia, Sri Lanka, Pakistan, and Bangladesh took part. India won the gold medal and has also won gold at the following six Asian Games in Hiroshima in 1994, Bangkok in 1998, Busan in 2002, Doha in 2006 and Guangzhou in 2010.

An attempt to popularise kabaddi in Great Britain was carried out by Channel 4, who commissioned a programme dedicated to the sport. The programme, kabaddi in the early 1990s, however, failed to capture viewer attention despite fixtures such as West Bengal Police versus the Punjab. Kabaddi was axed in 1992. Alt-rock band The Cooper Temple Clause formed a kabaddi team in 2001 and were, at one stage, ranked seventh in the British domestic standings.[10] [better source needed]

In the 1998 Asian games held at Bangkok (Thailand), the Indian kabaddi team clinched the gold medal. The chief coach of the team was former kabaddi player and coach Flt. Lt. S P Singh.

Seven-time gold medalist India suffered their first-ever loss in 28 years at the 2018 Asian Games to South Korea in the men's Kabaddi group A game. In the semi-final, Iran beat India with a 27–18 win. India, who took home the bronze for reaching the semi-finals, did not play in the final since the introduction of the Games in the Asiad in 1990 at Beijing.

== Variation ==
=== Standard style ===
In the international team version of kabaddi, two teams of seven members each occupy opposite halves of a field of 10 by 13 metres (33 ft × 43 ft) in case of men and 8 by 12 metres (26 ft × 39 ft) in case of women. Each has three supplementary players held in reserve. The game is played with 20-minute halves, with a 5-minute halftime break during which the teams exchange sides. During each raid, a player from the attacking side—known as the "raider"—runs into the opposing team's side of the field and attempts to tag as many of the seven defending players as possible. For a raid to be eligible for points, the raider must cross the baulk line in the defending team's territory, and return to their half of the field without being tackled. Whilst doing so, the raider must also chant the word "kabaddi", confirming to referees that their raid is done on a single rhythm. A 30-second shot clock is also enforced on each raid.

A point is scored for each defender tagged, and a point can also be scored if the raider can step into the area past the territory's bonus line. If the raider is successfully stopped, the opposing team earns a point instead. All players tagged are taken out of the game, but one is "revived" for each point a team scores from a subsequent tag or tackle (bonus points do not revive players). Players who step out of bounds are also out. A raid where no points are scored by the raider is referred to as an "empty raid". By contrast, a play where the raider scores three or more points is referred to as a "super raid". If a team gets all seven players on the opposing team out at once, an "All Out" is scored for two bonus points, and they are automatically revived.

Additional rules are used in the Pro Kabaddi League; if a team has two empty raids in a row, the next raider must score a point on his/her raid or else he/she will be out ("do-or-die raid"). Additionally, when a defending team has less than four players left on the field, tackles are worth 2 points ("super tackle").

=== Circle style ===
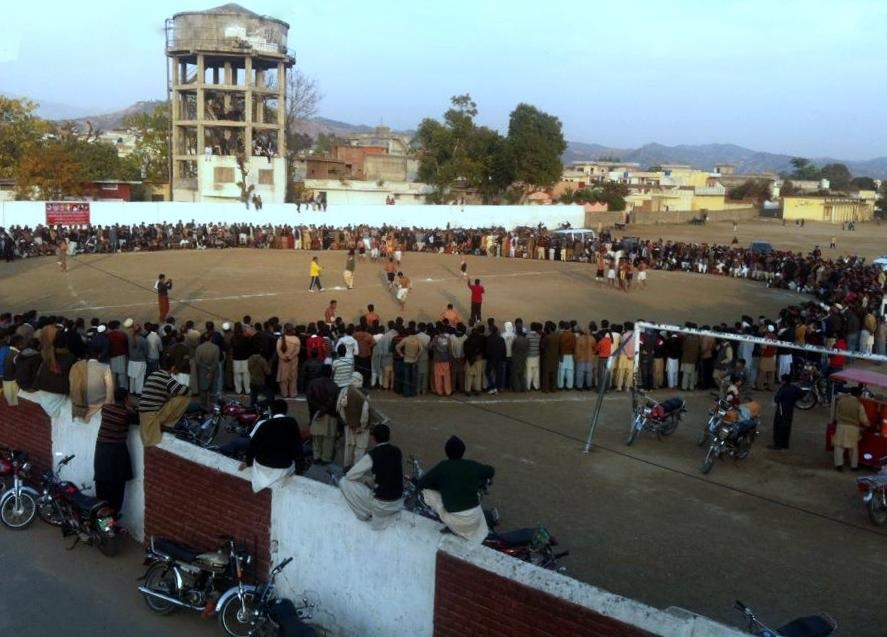
Circle Kabaddi

Four major forms of kabaddi played in India which are recognised by the amateur federation. In Sanjeevani kabaddi, one player is revived against one player of the opposite team who is out – one out. The game is played over 40 min with a 5 min break between halves. There are seven players on each side and the team that outs all the players on the opponent's side scores four extra points. In Gaminee style, seven players play on either side and a player put out has to remain out until all his team members are out. The team that is successful in ousting all the players of the opponent's side secures a point. The game continues until five or seven such points are secured and has no fixed time duration. Amar style resembles the Sanjeevani form in the time frame rule. But, a player who is declared out doesn't leave the court, but instead stays inside, and the play goes along. For every player of the opposition touched “out”, a team earns a point. Punjabi kabaddi is a variation that is played on a circular pitch of a radius of 22 metres (72 ft).

== International competitions ==
Note that all of the following competitions are played in standard style.

=== Kabaddi World Cup competitions ===
The International Kabaddi Federation has organised three Kabaddi World Cup tournaments for men and one for women, and held separate men's and women's tournaments in 2025. Thus far, these events have all been held in India with India winning first place each tournament and Iranalways coming in second.

A different organisation called World Kabaddi held its own standard style Kabaddi World Cup tournament in 2019 with both men's and women's competition, and it plans to hold another one in March 2025. The 2019 event was held in Malaysia, and both the men's and women's competitions were won by India.

As of February 2025, the governments of Punjab, India, and Punjab, Pakistan, have organised circle style World Cup tournaments seven times since 2010.

=== Pro Kabaddi League ===
Pro Kabaddi League was introduced in 2014 in India based on Indian premier league. The first edition of the tournament had begun at 26 July 2014 with eight franchises based in eight cities in India consisting of players from all over the world. The Jaipur Pink Panthers is owned by Bollywood star Abhishek Bachchan who said he wants to promote kabaddi. The other teams are the U Mumba based at Mumbai, the Bengaluru Bulls, the Delhi Dabbangs, the Puneri Paltans, the Telugu Titans based at Vizag, the Bengal Warriors based at Kolkata and the Patna Pirates based at Patna, Bihar. Among all seasons, Patna Pirates is the most successful team with three times title winner while U Mumba and Jaipur Pink Panthers shares 1-1 title.

The organisers have added four new teams in the PKL season 5, 2017: the Haryana Steelers, the Tamil Thalaivas from Tamil Nadu, the Gujarat Giants, and the UP Yoddha.

The opening match was held at Mumbai where Amitabh Bachchan was found cheering for his son's team. Aishwarya Rai was also present with Abhishek Bachchan. Together with them Bollywood stars Shahrukh Khan, Aamir Khan, Sunil Shetty, Sonali Bendre, Farah Khan, Boman Irani and producer Ronnie Screwvala cheering for his team Jaipur Pink Panthers were present at the stadium.

Indian star cricketer Sachin Tendulkar was present with his wife and daughter who said he enjoyed the speed, agility, and strength of the players of the sport very much.

Rakesh Kumar the captain of the Indian kabaddi team who has received an Arjuna Award and also the captain of Patna Pirates was also present at the inaugural matches who said it is a pleasure to see kabaddi getting recognition through the tournament.

Rakesh Kumar was the highest bought player in the auction by Patna pirates for 12.80 lakhs held before the tournament.

The broadcast rights were won by the Star Sports network.

== Domestic competitions ==
- Kabaddi nationals- The Kabaddi Senior Nationals is the pre-eminent tournament conducted by AKFI to promote the sport of kabaddi within India. In 2019 the 66th Edition of the tournament is being conducted in Roha, Raigad, with 31 teams competing.
- Federation Cup
- Telangana Premier Kabaddi League

== Performance by India national team in international competitions ==
=== Men's team ===
India national kabaddi team represents India in international kabaddi and India national kabaddi team competitions. India won gold medals at Asian Games in 1990, 1994, 1998, 2002, 2006, 2010, and 2014. The 2018 edition is Indian Team's not winning the gold medal first time.

==== World Cup (International Kabaddi Federation) ====
India has hosted and won all of the IKF world cups till now, and Iran has always come in second place. All these tournaments were held in India.

Year	Host	Final		
Year	Host	Winner	Score	Runner-up
2004	Mumbai & Chennai, India	India	55–27	Iran
2007	Navi Mumbai, India	India	29–19	Iran
2016	Ahmedabad, India	India	38–29	Iran

==== World Cup (circle style) ====
India has won six Kabaddi world cups out of seven played till now.

Year	Host	Final			Third place match		
Year	Host	Winner	Score	Runner-up	3rd place	Score	4th place
2010	Punjab, India	India	58–24	Pakistan	Canada	66–22	Italy
2011	Punjab, India	India	59–25	Canada	Pakistan	60–22	Italy
2012	Punjab, India	India	59–25	Pakistan	Canada	51–35	Iran
2013	Punjab, India	India	48–39	Pakistan	United States	62–27	England
2014	Punjab, India	India	45–42	Pakistan	Iran	48–31	England
2016	Punjab, India	India	62–20	England	United States	43–39	Iran
2020	Punjab, India	India	43–41	India	Iran	54-33	Australia

==== Asian Games ====
Year	Host	Final			Third place match		
Year	Host	Winner	Score	Runner-up	3rd place	Score	4th place
1990; Details	(China); Beijing	India		Bangladesh	Pakistan		Japan
1994; Details	(Japan); Hiroshima	India		Bangladesh	Pakistan		Japan
1998; Details	(Thailand); Bangkok	India	No playoffs	Pakistan	Bangladesh	No playoffs	Sri Lanka
2002; Details	(South Korea); Busan	India	No playoffs	Bangladesh	Pakistan	No playoffs	Japan
2006; Details	(Qatar); Doha	India	35–23	Pakistan	Bangladesh	37–26	Iran
2010; Details	(China); Guangzhou	India	37–20	Iran	Pakistan	No playoffs	Japan
2014; Details	(South Korea); Incheon	India	27–25	Iran	Pakistan	No playoffs	South Korea
2018; Details	(Indonesia) Jakarta–Palembang	Iran	26-16	South Korea	India	No playoffs	Pakistan
2022; Details	(China); Hangzhou	India	33–29	Iran	Pakistan	No playoffs	Chinese Taipei

==== Asian Indoor games ====
Year	Host	Final			Third place	
Year	Host	Gold	Score	Silver	Bronze	Bronze
2007; Details	Macau	India	35–17	Pakistan	Bangladesh	Iran
2009; Details	(Vietnam); Hanoi	India	57–33	Iran	Bangladesh	Sri Lanka

==== South Asian Games ====
India is very strong in kabaddi as these results show. India won 10 gold medals out of a possible 11 until the 2019 South Asian Games.

Year	Winner	Runner-up	3rd Place
1985; Details	India	Bangladesh	Pakistan
1987; Details	India	Bangladesh	Pakistan
1989; Details	India	Pakistan	Bangladesh
1993; Details	India	Pakistan	Bangladesh
1995; Details	India	Bangladesh	Pakistan
1999; Details	India	Pakistan	Sri Lanka
2004; Details	India	Pakistan	Bangladesh
2006; Details	India	Pakistan	Bangladesh
2010; Details	India	Pakistan	Bangladesh; Nepal
2016; Details	India	Pakistan	Bangladesh; Sri Lanka
2019; Details	India	Sri Lanka	Pakistan; Bangladesh

=== Women's team ===
India women's national kabaddi team represents India in international women's kabaddi events.

==== Circle style World Cup events ====
Year	Host	Final		
Year	Host	Winner	Score	Runner-up
2012	Patna, India	India	25–19	Iran
2013	Punjab, India	India	49–21	New Zealand
2014	Punjab, India	India	36–27	New Zealand

==== Asian Games ====
Year	Host	Final			Third place	
Year	Host	Winner	Score	Runner-up	Third place	
2010; Details	(China); Guangzhou	India	28–14	Thailand	Bangladesh	Iran
2014; Details	(South Korea); Incheon	India	31–21	Iran	Bangladesh	Thailand
2018; Details	(Indonesia); Jakarta–Palembang	India	27-24	Iran	Chinese Taipei	Thailand
2022; Details	(China); Hangzhou	India	26-25	Chinese Taipei	Iran	Nepal

== Federation ==
=== India ===
The Kabaddi Federation of India (KFI) was founded in 1950, and it compiled a standard set of rules. The Amateur Kabaddi Federation of India (AKFI) was founded in 1973. The AKFI has given new shape to the rules and it has also the rights of modification in the rules. The Asian Kabaddi Federation was founded under the chairmanship of Sharad Pawar.

The Governing body of Kabaddi in Asia is the Asian Kabaddi Federation (AKF) headed by Mr. Janardan Singh Gehlot. AKF is affiliated to the Olympic Council of Asia.

The parent body to regulate the game at the international level is the International Kabaddi Federation (IKF). India won the 2013 Kabaddi World Cup by defeating Pakistan in finals at Punjab. India had won the 2016 Kabaddi World Cup by defeating Iran.

=== List of National Sports award recipients in Kabaddi, showing the year, award, and gender ===
Year	Recipient	Award	Gender
1972	S. M. Shetty	Arjuna Award	Male
1973	Bhola Nath Guin	Arjuna Award	Male
1978–1979	S. P. Khatavkar	Arjuna Award	Female
1980–1981	Shantaram Jadhav	Arjuna Award	Male
1981	Monika Nath	Arjuna Award	Female
1983	Maya Kashinath	Arjuna Award	Female
1986	Rama Sarkar	Arjuna Award	Female
1990	Hardeep Singh	Arjuna Award	Male
1994	Subbiah Rajaratnam	Arjuna Award	Male
1994	Ashok D. Shinde	Arjuna Award	Male
1995	P. Ganesan	Arjuna Award	Male
1996	Shriram Bhavsar	Arjuna Award	Male
1996	Neta Moreshwar Dadwe	Arjuna Award	Female
1997	Randhir Singh	Arjuna Award	Male
1998	Ashan Kumar	Arjuna Award	Male
1998	Biswajit Palit	Arjuna Award	Male
1999	Tirath Raj ^{+}	Arjuna Award	Male
1999	Balwinder Singh ^{+}	Arjuna Award	Male
2000	C. Honappa	Arjuna Award	Male
2001	B. C. Ramesh	Arjuna Award	Male
2002	Ram Mehar Singh	Arjuna Award	Male
2003	Sanjeev Kumar	Arjuna Award	Male
2004	Sunder Singh	Arjuna Award	Male
2005	Ramesh Kumar	Arjuna Award	Male
2006	Navneet Gautam	Arjuna Award	Male
2009	Pankaj Navnath Shirsat	Arjuna Award	Male
2010	Dinesh Kumar	Arjuna Award	Male
2011	Rakesh Kumar	Arjuna Award	Male
2011	Tejaswini Bai V.	Arjuna Award	Female
2012	Anup Kumar	Arjuna Award	Male
2014	Mamatha Poojary	Arjuna Award	Female
2015	Manjeet Chhillar	Arjuna Award	Male
2015	Abhilasha Mhatre	Arjuna Award	Female
2017	Jasvir Singh	Arjuna Award	Male
2019	Ajay Thakur	Arjuna Award	Male
2020	Deepak Niwas Hooda	Arjuna Award	Male
2021	Sandeep Narwal	Arjuna Award	Male
2022	Sakshi Kumari	Arjuna Award	Female
2007	Shamsher Singh	Dhyan Chand Award	Male
2020	Manpreet Singh	Dhyan Chand Award	Male
2021	Vikas Kumar	Dhyan Chand Award	Male
2022	B.C. Suresh	Dhyan Chand Award	Male
2019	Rambir Singh Khokar ^{+}	Dronacharya Award	Male
2020	Krishan Kumar Hooda ^{+}	Dronacharya Award	Male
2021	Ashan Kumar ^{+}	Dronacharya Award	Male
2002	E. Prasad Rao	Dronacharya Award	Male
2005	Balwan Singh	Dronacharya Award	Male
2012	Sunil Dabas	Dronacharya Award	Female
2017	Heera Nand Kataria	Dronacharya Award	Male

Key
+ Indicates a Lifetime contribution honour

== Films about kabaddi ==
- Okkadu (2003)
- Kabaddi Kabaddi (2003)
- Ghilli (2004)
- Vennila Kabadi Kuzhu (2009)
- Bheemli Kabadi Jattu (2010)
- Kennedy Club (2019)
- Panga (2020)
- Seetimaarr (2021)

Pop culture references In the 1993 movie Little Buddha in which Keanu Reeves plays the Siddhartha Gautama, a game of kabaddi is depicted.

== See also ==
- India national kabaddi team
- India women's national kabaddi team
- Pro Kabaddi League
- Women's Kabaddi Challenge
- Kabaddi at the Asian Games
- World Kabaddi League
- Global Indian Pravasi Kabaddi League
- Punjabi Kabaddi
- Kho kho
- Tag
