= Kabaddi at the 2007 Asian Indoor Games =

- Venue: Luso-Chinesa School Pavilion
- Dates: 30 October – 3 November 2007

Kabaddi was contested by seven teams at the 2007 Asian Indoor Games in Macau, China from 30 October to 3 November. The competition took place at Luso-Chinesa School Pavilion.

India won the gold medal after beating Pakistan in the final 35–17.

== Medalists ==
Event	Gold	Silver	Bronze
Men	India; Navneet Gautam; Joginder; Naveen Kumar; Pankaj Shirsat; Jasmer; Jasvir Singh; Rakesh Kumar; Satbir Singh; Ashish Ashok Mhatre; Ajay Thakur; Dinesh Kumar; Jagdeep Singh	Pakistan; Wajid Ali; Nasir Ali; Maqsood Ali; Muhammad Arshad; Adnan Afzal; Basharat Subhani; Rahat Maqsood; Waseem Sajjad; Naveel Akram; Ibrar Hussain; Sajjad Hussain; Muhammad Akram	Iran; Abdolhamid Maghsoudloo; Mohammad Bagher Mazandarani; Ramezan Ali Paeinmahalli; Farhad Kamal Gharibi; Kianoush Naderian; Moslem Amiri; Houman Seidi; Nasser Roumiani; Ali Doustmohammadi; Reza Kamali Moghaddam; Morteza Shahidi; Ebad Dalili
Men	India; Navneet Gautam; Joginder; Naveen Kumar; Pankaj Shirsat; Jasmer; Jasvir Singh; Rakesh Kumar; Satbir Singh; Ashish Ashok Mhatre; Ajay Thakur; Dinesh Kumar; Jagdeep Singh	Pakistan; Wajid Ali; Nasir Ali; Maqsood Ali; Muhammad Arshad; Adnan Afzal; Basharat Subhani; Rahat Maqsood; Waseem Sajjad; Naveel Akram; Ibrar Hussain; Sajjad Hussain; Muhammad Akram	Bangladesh; Ziaur Rahman; Al Mamun; Abu Salah Musa; Mozammal Haque; Enamul Haque; Kamal Hossain; Bozlur Rashid; Rabiul Islam; Abdul Kader; Sadaqul Islam

== Results ==
=== Preliminary ===
Pos	Team	Pld	W	D	L	PF	PA	PD	Pts
1	India	6	6	0	0	248	89	+159	12
2	Pakistan	6	5	0	1	252	104	+148	10
3	Iran	6	4	0	2	249	114	+135	8
4	Bangladesh	6	3	0	3	173	168	+5	6
5	Japan	6	2	0	4	155	174	−19	4
6	Sri Lanka	6	1	0	5	88	217	−129	2
7	Malaysia	6	0	0	6	127	426	−299	0

Source: Official website

30 October
9:00

Bangladesh	39–28 (HT: 18–15)	Japan

Luso-Chinesa School Pavilion, Macau

30 October
10:00

Pakistan	92–19 (HT: 49–5)	Malaysia

Luso-Chinesa School Pavilion, Macau

30 October
11:00

India	40–11 (HT: 22–4)	Sri Lanka

Luso-Chinesa School Pavilion, Macau

30 October
18:00

Japan	57–13 (HT: 17–7)	Malaysia

Luso-Chinesa School Pavilion, Macau

30 October
19:00

Iran	55–9 (HT: 26–3)	Sri Lanka

Luso-Chinesa School Pavilion, Macau

31 October
9:00

India	65–22 (HT: 30–8)	Malaysia

Luso-Chinesa School Pavilion, Macau

31 October
10:00

Bangladesh	28–17 (HT: 17–5)	Sri Lanka

Luso-Chinesa School Pavilion, Macau

31 October
11:00

Pakistan	41–20 (HT: 26–4)	Japan

Luso-Chinesa School Pavilion, Macau

31 October
18:00

India	36–12 (HT: 24–4)	Bangladesh

Luso-Chinesa School Pavilion, Macau

31 October
19:00

Pakistan	27–12 (HT: 17–5)	Iran

Luso-Chinesa School Pavilion, Macau

1 November
9:00

Pakistan	43–5 (HT: 31–0)	Sri Lanka

Luso-Chinesa School Pavilion, Macau

1 November
10:00

India	39–13 (HT: 26–5)	Japan

Luso-Chinesa School Pavilion, Macau

1 November
11:00

Bangladesh	16–35 (HT: 10–13)	Iran

Luso-Chinesa School Pavilion, Macau

1 November
17:00

Malaysia	33–35 (HT: 6–14)	Sri Lanka

Luso-Chinesa School Pavilion, Macau

1 November
18:00

Iran	31–19 (HT: 13–12)	Japan

Luso-Chinesa School Pavilion, Macau

1 November
19:00

India	41–21 (HT: 22–12)	Pakistan

Luso-Chinesa School Pavilion, Macau

2 November
9:00

Iran	106–16 (HT: 41–7)	Malaysia

Luso-Chinesa School Pavilion, Macau

2 November
10:00

Pakistan	28–7 (HT: 13–1)	Bangladesh

Luso-Chinesa School Pavilion, Macau

2 November
11:00

Japan	18–11 (HT: 9–6)	Sri Lanka

Luso-Chinesa School Pavilion, Macau

2 November
18:00

Bangladesh	71–24 (HT: 32–16)	Malaysia

Luso-Chinesa School Pavilion, Macau

2 November
19:00

India	27–10 (HT: 15–6)	Iran

Luso-Chinesa School Pavilion, Macau

=== Gold medal match ===
3 November
11:00

India	35–17 (HT: 17–8)	Pakistan

Luso-Chinesa School Pavilion, Macau
