= Pakistan at the 2010 Asian Games =

- IOC code: PAK
- NOC: Pakistan Olympic Association

in Guangzhou
- Competitors: 177 in 17 sports
- Flag bearer: Zeeshan Ashraf
- Officials: 51
- Medals Ranked 19th: Gold 3 Silver 2 Bronze 3 Total 8

Asian Games appearances (overview)
- 1954; 1958; 1962; 1966; 1970; 1974; 1978; 1982; 1986; 1990; 1994; 1998; 2002; 2006; 2010; 2014; 2018; 2022; 2026

Pakistan participated in the 2010 Asian Games held in Guangzhou, China on 12–27 November 2010. These games yielded three team gold medals for Pakistan, including a field hockey (men) gold after 20 years at the Asian Games, the country's eighth overall, and also its first major field hockey title since winning the 1994 World Cup in Sydney, Australia. It also saw Pakistan become gold medallist in the inaugural events of cricket (women) and squash (men's team).

== Opening ceremony ==
Originally, the Commonwealth Games gold medalist Azhar Hussain was nominated to carry the flag, but a conflict with his training schedule forced the officials to nominate the country's field hockey captain, Zeeshan Ashraf instead. Pakistan's president, Asif Ali Zardari, attended the opening ceremony as a guest of the Chinese.

== Medalists ==
Medal	Name	Sport	Discipline	Date
Gold	Pakistan national women's cricket team	Cricket	Women	19 November
Gold	Pakistan	Squash	Men's Team	25 November
Gold	Pakistan national field hockey team	Field hockey	Men's Team	25 November
Silver	Ijaz Ahmed	Wushu	Sanshou (75 kg)	17 November
Silver	Aamir Atlas Khan	Squash	Men-individual	21 November
Bronze	Imran Shehzad; Shahram Changezi; Sohail Shehzad	Snooker	Team	15 November
Bronze	Pakistan	Kabaddi	Men's Team	25 November
Bronze	Pakistan national men's cricket team	Cricket	Men	26 November

== Baseball ==
The Pakistan baseball team qualified for the Asian Games after winning the Asia Cup qualifiers in Islamabad earlier in the year.

=== Men ===
==== Group B ====
Pos	Team	Pld	W	L	RF	RA	PCT	GB	Qualification
1	South Korea	3	3	0	38	1	1.000	—	Semifinals
2	Chinese Taipei	3	2	1	28	7	.667	1	Semifinals
3	Pakistan	3	1	2	6	31	.333	2	
4	Hong Kong	3	0	3	3	36	.000	3	

Source: Results

13 November 2010 – 12:00

Team	1	2	3	4	5	6	7	8	9	R	H	E
Pakistan	0	0	0	0	0	1	1	0	3	5	11	1
Hong Kong	0	0	1	0	2	0	0	0	0	3	5	4
WP: Ihsan Ihsan Ullah LP:

14 November 2010 – 13:00

Team	1	2	3	4	5	6	7	8	9	R	H	E
Pakistan	0	0	0	0	0	0	0	1	-	1	4	7
Chinese Taipei	0	1	2	3	0	3	0	2	-	11	12	0
Starting pitchers: Away: Muhammad Asif; Home: Hsiao I-chieh; WP: Pan Wei-lun LP: Asif Muhammad; Home runs: Away: None; Home: Chen Yung-chi (1)

16 November 2010 12:00

Team	1	2	3	4	5	6	7	8	9	R	H	E
South Korea	3	4	1	0	9	-	-	-	-	17	15	1
Pakistan	0	0	0	0	0	-	-	-	-	0	2	4
Starting pitchers: Away: Kim Myung-Sung; Home: Haider Saleem; WP: Kim Myung-Sung LP: Haider Saleem

== Boxing ==
=== Men ===
Competitor(s)	Event	Round of 32	Opponent	Round of 16	Opponent	Quarter-finals	Opponent
Muhammad Waseem	Lightflyweight (49 kg)	3–1	(Iran) Masoud Rigi	0–11	(India) Amandeep Singh		---
Niamatullah	Bantamweight (56 kg)		---	RSC	(Uzbekistan) Orzubek Shayimov		---
Nawaz Dad Khan	Lightweight (60 kg)	4–10	(Turkmenistan) Amangeldi Hudaybergenov		---		---
Amir Khan	Light Welterweight (64 kg)	5–4	(Japan) Masatsugu Kawachi	4–13	(Kyrgyzstan) Ermek Sakenov		---
Arshad Hussain	Welterweight (69 kg)	RSC	(Palestine) Ahmed Altaramsi	5–12	(Philippines) Wilfredo Lopez		---
Nisar Khan	Middleweight (75 kg)		---	1–16	(Iran) Mohammad Sattarpour		---
Mir Wais Khan	Super heavyweight (91 kg)		---		---	0–4	(Iran) Roohollah Hosseini

Officials

Chief coach	(Cuba) Francisco Hernandez Roldan
Assistant coach	(Pakistan) Arshad Hussain
Team manager	(Pakistan) Waqar Maroof

== Cricket ==
Pakistan will send both men's and women's teams to the Games.

=== Men ===
The following players were selected to participate:

1. Khalid Latif (Captain)
2. Sharjeel Khan
3. Sheharyar Ghani
4. Azeem Ghumman
5. Akbar-ur-Rehman
6. Naeemuddin
7. Naeem Anjum
8. Usman Qadir
9. Sarmad Bhatti
10. Aizaz Cheema
11. Lal Kumar
12. Mohammad Irshad
13. Raza Hasan
14. Bilawal Bhatti
15. Jalat Khan

==== Knockout stage ====
Quarter-finals
22 November
Pakistan	183/1
China	55/9
23 November
Afghanistan	66/2
Hong Kong	63/10
23 November
Bangladesh	150/7
Malaysia	80/10
24 November
Sri Lanka	73/8
Nepal	72/10

Semi-finals
25 November
Pakistan	103/7
Afghanistan	125/8
25 November
Bangladesh	102/5
Sri Lanka	101/10

Final
26 November
Afghanistan	118/8
Bangladesh	119/5
Third place
26 November
Pakistan	141/4
Sri Lanka	135/10

==== Quarterfinals ====
22 November
09:30
scorecard

Pakistan; 183/1 (20 Overs)	v	China; 55/9 (20 Overs)
Khalid Latif 103* (69) 8X4, 5X6; Zhang Yufei 31/1 (4 Overs)		Li Jian 14 (23) 3X4; Hasan Raza 10/3 (4 Overs)

Pakistan won by 128 runs.
Guangdong International Cricket Stadium, Guangdong
Umpires: BB Pradhan (Nep), N Sivan (Mas)
Player of the match: Khalid Latif

- Pakistan won the toss and elected to bat first

==== Semifinals ====
25 November
09:30
scorecard

Pakistan; 103/7 (20 Overs)	v	Afghanistan; 125/8 (20 Overs)
Khalid Latif 26 (32) 3X4; Hamid Hassan 16/2 (4 Overs)		Shabir Noori 35 (30) 2X4, 2X6; Raza Hasan 19/2 (4 Overs)

Afghanistan won by 22 runs.
Guangdong International Cricket Stadium, Guangdong

- Pakistan won the toss and elected to field first

==== Bronze-medal match ====
26 November
09:30
scorecard

Pakistan; 141/4 (18 Overs)	v	Sri Lanka; 135/10 (19.5 Overs)
Khalid Latif 53* (42) 2X4, 4X6; S Weerakon 9/1 (2 Overs)		EMGDY Munaweera 28 (24) 2X4, 1X6; Raza Hasan 19/2 (4 Overs)

Pakistan won by 6 wickets
Guangdong International Cricket Stadium, Guangdong
Umpires: Sun Jianxin (Chi) and Buddhi Pradhan (Nep)

- Pakistan won the toss and elected to bowl

=== Women ===
The following players were selected to participate:

1. Sana Mir (Captain)
2. Marina Iqbal (Vice Captain),
3. Syeda Nain Fatima Abidi
4. Bismah Maroof
5. Mariam Hasan Shah
6. Javeria Khan
7. Nida Rashid Dar
8. Kanwal Naz
9. Nahida Khan
10. Syeda Batool Fatima Naqvi (WK)
11. Shumaila Qureshi
12. Asmavia Iqbal Khokar
13. Kainat Imtiaz
14. Sania Khan

Officials
Head coach	(Pakistan) Mansoor Rana
Team manager	(Pakistan) Ayesha Ashhar
Physio	(Pakistan) Suniana Munir
Fielding coach	(Pakistan) Abdul Majeed

==== Round of 16 ====
14 November
09:30
Report

Pakistan; 50/2 (8.3 Overs)	v	Thailand; 49/10 (19.3 Overs)
Nida Rashid 21* (18); 4/1 SAISUD Thanapan (1.3 overs)		KOSATHONG Siwaporn 10 (37); 8/4 Gulzar Sana (4 overs)

Pakistan won by 8 Wickets.
Guangdong International Cricket Stadium, Guangdong
Umpires: (Malaysia) Kalidas Viswanaoan and (Nepal) Buddhi Bahadur Pradhan

- Thailand won the toss and elected to bat first

===== Quarterfinals =====
15 November
09:30

China; 60/5 (20 overs)	v	Pakistan; 64/1 (12.2 overs)
Mei Zhang 14 (32); Mei Chunchua 9/1 (3 overs)		Nida Rashid 27 (29)

Pakistan won by 9 wickets
Guangdong International Cricket Stadium, Guangdong

- Pakistan won the toss and elected to bowl

===== Semifinals =====
18 November
13:30
Report

Japan; 61/8 (20 overs)	v	Pakistan; 62/1 (10.4 overs)
Ema Kuribayashi 24 (37); Fuyuki Kawai 8/1 (1 over)		Javeria Wadood 29 (25); Sana Gulzar 8/2 (4 overs)

Pakistan won by 9 wickets
Guangdong International Cricket Stadium, Guangdong

- Japan won the toss and elected to bat

===== Finals =====
19 November
13:30
Report

Bangladesh; 92/10 (20.0 overs)	v	Pakistan; 93/0 (15.4 overs)
Salma Khatun 24 (31)		Nida Rashid 51* (43); Nida Rashid 16/3 (4 overs)

Pakistan won by 10 wickets
Guangdong International Cricket Stadium, Guangdong
Umpires: (Nepal) BB Pradhan and (Singapore) Sarika Prasad

- Pakistan won the toss and elected to bowl.

== Cue sports ==
=== Men ===
==== Snooker ====
Competitor(s)	Event	Preliminary match	Opponent	Preliminary match	Opponent	Round of 16	Opponent
Khurram Agha	Singles	4–2	(Malaysia) Hoo Mho	4–0	(International Olympic Committee) Megdad Tagi	1–4	(Hong Kong) Kowk Fung
Muhammad Sajjad	Singles			4–1	(Afghanistan) Muhammad Zahi	0–4	(Hong Kong) Marco Fu

==== Snooker ====
Competitor(s)	Event	Preliminary match	Opponent	Round of 16	Opponent	Quarterfinals	Opponent	Semifinals	Opponent	Rank
Sohail Shehzad; Shahram Changezi; Imran Shehzad	Team	3–0	(International Olympic Committee) Athletes from Kuwait	3–1	(Hong Kong) Hongkong	3–0	(Iraq) NISUIF Ayhab (Iraq) ALI Ali	0–3	India	Bronze medal

Officials

Chief-de-Mission	(Pakistan) Alamgir Shaikh
Manager	(Pakistan) Shoaib Alam Khan

== Football ==
Initially, Pakistan was not sending a team to compete in these games, but after the President of Pakistan Football Federation, Makhdoom Faisal Saleh Hayat committed to bearing the expenses of the team, it was once again included in the Games. Pakistan is in Group F with Oman, Thailand and Maldives.

=== Men ===
Goalkeepers (2)

- Amir Gul (NBP)
- Jaffar Khan (Army) (CAPT)

Defenders (6)

- Umer Farooq (KESC)
- Samar Ishaq (KRL) (VC)
- Ahsan Ullah (PEL)
- Aurangzaib (HBL)
- Muhammad Ahmed (WAPDA)
- Atif Bashir (Barry Town)

Midfielders (7)

- Mehmood Khan (KRL)
- Yasir Afridi (KRL)
- Muhammad Adil (KRL)
- Muhammad Tauseef (Islamabad)
- Abbas Ali (NBP)
- Zain Ullah (WAPDA)
- Faisal Iqbal (NBP)

Strikers (5)

- Kalim Ullah Khan (KRL)
- Rizwan Asif (KRL)
- Saddam Hussain (NBP)
- Shani Qayum ( Sheffield Wednesday Youth)
- Faraz Ahmed (Nottingham)

Officials
Head coach	(Pakistan) Akhtar Mohiuddin
Coaching Consultant	(England) Graham Roberts
Assistant coach	(Pakistan) Hassan Baloch
Goalkeeping coach	(Pakistan) Noman Ibrahim
Team manager	(Pakistan) Asghar Khan Anjum
Team Doctor & Physiotherapist	(Pakistan) Dr. Kamran Mehdi

==== Group F ====
Pos	Team	Pld	W	D	L	GF	GA	GD	Pts
1	Oman	3	2	1	0	6	1	+5	7
2	Thailand	3	1	2	0	7	1	+6	5
3	Maldives	3	0	2	1	0	3	−3	2
4	Pakistan	3	0	1	2	0	8	−8	1

Source: RSSSF
7 November
19:00

Thailand	6–0	Pakistan
Thonglao 15', 29'; Dangda 16', 73'; Keawsombat 59'; Jujeen 65'

Huangpu Sports Center, Guangzhou
Referee: Ali Sabbagh (Lebanon)

9 November
19:00

Maldives	0–0	Pakistan
	Report

Huangpu Sports Center, Guangzhou
Referee: Yu Ming-hsun (Chinese Taipei)

11 November
19:00

Oman	2–0	Pakistan
Al-Gheilani 10'; Al-Saadi 65'	Report

Guangdong People's Stadium, Guangzhou
Referee: Vo Minh Tri (Vietnam)

== Field hockey ==
Pakistan will hold a training camp for the team at Lahore from 24 October until the beginning of the Games. PHF announced a 16-member team on 3 November, which saw the return of Sohail Abbas and Salman Akbar and the retention of Zeeshan Ashraf as captain.

=== Men ===
1. Zeeshan Ashraf (captain)
2. Muhammad Imran (vice-captain)
3. Salman Akbar (goal keeper)
4. Sohail Abbas
5. Muhammad Irfan
6. Waseem Ahmed
7. Muhammad Rashid
8. Fareed Ahmad
9. Muhammad Tousiq
10. Abdul Haseem Khan
11. Rehan Butt
12. Shakeel Abbasi
13. Shafqat Rasool
14. Muhammad Zubair
15. Mohammad Waqas Sharif
16. Mohammad Rizwan

Officials

Head coach	(Netherlands) Michel Van Den
Assistant coach	(Pakistan) Ahmad Alam and Ajmal Khan
Team manager	(Pakistan) Khawaja Junaid
Video Analyst	(Pakistan) Nadeem Khan Lodhi

==== Pool B ====
Team	Pld	W	D	L	GF	GA	GD	Pts
India	4	4	0	0	22	4	+18	12
Pakistan	4	3	0	1	28	6	+22	9
Japan	4	2	0	2	13	13	0	6
Bangladesh	4	1	0	3	9	21	−12	3
Hong Kong	4	0	0	4	4	32	−28	0

17 November 2010
15:00

Pakistan	12–0	Hong Kong
Butt 2' 58'; Abbas 8' 29'; Ahmed 22'; Waqas 24' 50' 53'; Haseem Khan 31' 55'; Imran 35' 61'	Report

Umpires:
Thani Saheen Al Wahabi (OMA)
John Hrytsak (CAN)

18 November 2010
19:30

Pakistan	8–2	Japan
	Report

Umpires:
Dekang Chen (CHN)
Jungmin Jang (KOR)

20 November 2010
15:00

Pakistan	2–3	India
Butt 4'; Abbasi 43'	Report	S. Singh 03' 48'; D Singh 16'

21 November 2010
14:30

Pakistan	6 -1	Bangladesh
Abbasi 13' 27'; Abbas 15' 29'; Imran 37' 48'	Report	Barmon 63'

==== First to fourth place classification ====
Semi-finals
23 November 2010
South Korea	1 (3)
Pakistan	1 (4)
23 November 2010
India	3
Malaysia	4 AET

Final
25 November 2010
Pakistan	2
Malaysia	0
Third place
25 November 2010
South Korea	0
India	1

==== Semifinals ====
23 November 2010
15:00

South Korea	1(3) – 1(4)	Pakistan
Kang 39'		Waqas 22'

==== Finals ====
25 November 2010
17:00

Pakistan	2–0	Malaysia
Abbas 26'; Butt 38'

== Judo ==
=== Men ===
Competitor(s)	Event	1/8 round	Opponent
Zahid Iqbal	Heavyweight (+100 kg)	000–100	(Japan) Daiki Kamikawa
Shah Hussain Shah	Half heavyweight (−100 kg)	000 S1–100	(Kazakhstan) Maxim Rakov
Aiat Ullah	Half lightweight (−66 kg)	000–100	(Uzbekistan) Mirzohid Farmonov
Muzafar Iqbal	Middleweight (−90 kg)		

=== Women ===
Competitor(s)	Event	Premilinary round	Opponent
Fouzia Mumtaz	Middleweight (−70 kg)	0–100	(North Korea) Kyong Sol
Humaira Ashiq	(−48 kg)		

== Kabaddi ==
=== Men ===
- Maqsood Ali
- Muhammad Ali
- Nasir Ali
- Wajid Ali
- Muhammad Arshad
- Akhlaq Hussain
- Ibrar Hussain
- Muhammad Khalid
- Abrar Khan
- Abdul Mukhtar
- Wasim Sajjad
- Atif Waheed

==== Group B ====
Pos	Team	Pld	W	D	L	PF	PA	PD	Pts	Qualification
1	Pakistan	3	3	0	0	115	53	+62	6	Semifinals
2	Japan	3	2	0	1	74	58	+16	4	Semifinals
3	Bangladesh	3	1	0	2	76	89	−13	2	
4	Malaysia	3	0	0	3	82	147	−65	0	

Source: Results

22 November

Pakistan	51 – 27	Malaysia

23 November

Pakistan	28 – 11	Japan

24 November

Pakistan	36– 15	Bangladesh

==== Knockout round ====
Semifinal
25 November
India	52
Japan	17
25 November
Pakistan	16
Iran	17

Final
26 November
India	37
Iran	20

== Karate ==
=== Men ===
Competitor(s)	Event	Round of 16	Opponent
Saadi Abbas Jalbani	(−67 kg)	4–8	(Macau) Iat Long Pang

== Sailing ==
=== Men ===
- Muhammad Yousaf – Laser
- Xerxes byram avari – Double Handed Dinghy 470
- Mehboob Nil – Double Handed Dinghy 470
- Muhammad Sajjad – Mistral

== Shooting ==
=== Pistol – Men ===
Competitor(s)	Event	Average	Points	Rank
Kalim Ullah Khan	50m Pistol singles	8.850	531-5x	37
Kaleem Ullah	50m Pistol Singles	8.983	539-2x	30

=== Pistol – Women ===
Competitor(s)	Event	Average	Points	Rank
Meshall Munir	10m Air Pistol Singles	9.375	375-8x	24
Tazeem Akhtar Abbasi	10m Air Pistol Singles	9.150	366-4x	41
Meshall Munir	25m Pistol Singles	8.517	511-6x	42
Tazeem Akhtar Abbasi	25m Pistol Singles	9.317	559-4x	33

=== Rifle – Women ===
Competitor(s)	Event	Average	Points	Rank
Urooj Fatima	10m Air Rifle singles	9.750	390-23x	34
Nazish Khan	10m Air Rifle Singles	9.600	384-14x	47

== Squash ==
=== Men ===
==== Singles ====
Competitor(s)	Event	Second round	Opponent	Quarterfinals	Opponent	Semifinals	Opponent	Finals	Opponent	Rank
Aamir Atlas Khan	Singles	3–0	(Jordan) Ahmad Al Zabidi	3–1	(Pakistan) Farhan Mehboob	3–1	(Malaysia) Ong Beng Hee	0–3	(Malaysia) Mohamad Azlan Iskandar	Silver medal
Farhan Mehboob	Singles	3–0	(Japan) TSUKUE Shinnosuke	1–3	(Pakistan) Aamir Atlas Khan		---		---	

==== Team ====
- Aamir Atlas Khan
- Danish Atlas Khan
- Farhan Mehboob
- Yasir Butt

===== Group A =====
Team	Pld	W	L	SF	SA	Pts
Pakistan	4	4	0	11	1	8
Hong Kong	4	3	1	8	4	6
Kuwait	4	2	2	8	4	4
Sri Lanka	4	1	3	3	9	2
China	4	0	4	0	12	0

Date		Score		Match 1	Match 2	Match 3
22 Nov	Pakistan	3–0	Sri Lanka	3–0	3–1	3–0
22 Nov	Pakistan	2–1	Kuwait	1–3	3–0	3–0
23 Nov	Pakistan	3–0	China	3–0	3–0	3–0
23 Nov	Pakistan	3–0	Hong Kong	3–0	3–1	3–1

===== Knockout round =====
Semifinal
Pakistan	3	3
India	1	1
Malaysia	3	3
Hong Kong	2	0

Final
Pakistan	3	3
Malaysia	0	0

=== Women ===
==== Singles ====
Competitor(s)	Event	First round	Opponent
Saima Shoukat	Singles	0–3	(Hong Kong) Ho Ling Chan
Maria Toorpaki Wazir	Singles	0–3	(Hong Kong) Wing Au

==== Team ====
- Maria Toorpaki Wazir
- Saima Shoukat
- Zoya Khalid

===== Group B =====
Team	Pld	W	L	SF	SA	Pts
Hong Kong	3	3	0	9	0	6
India	3	2	1	6	3	4
China	3	1	2	2	7	2
Pakistan	3	0	3	1	8	0

Date		Score		Match 1	Match 2	Match 3
22 Nov	Hong Kong	3–0	Pakistan	3–0	3–0	3–0
22 Nov	India	3–0	Pakistan	3–1	3–0	3–0
23 Nov	China	2–1	Pakistan	3–0	0–3	3–0

== Tennis ==
=== Men ===
Competitor(s)	Event	First round	Opponent	Second round	Opponent
Aqeel Khan	Singles	6–3, 6–4	(Cambodia) Kenny Bun	2–6, 4–6	(Japan) G Soeda

== Volleyball ==
=== Men ===
==== Group A ====
Pos	Team	Pld	W	L	Pts	SPW	SPL	SPR	SW	SL	SR	Qualification
1	China	3	3	0	6	268	220	1.218	9	2	4.500	Second round / Group E–F
2	Thailand	3	2	1	5	305	300	1.017	7	7	1.000	Second round / Group E–F
3	Pakistan	3	1	2	4	283	308	0.919	6	8	0.750	Second round / Group G–H
4	Chinese Taipei	3	0	3	3	254	282	0.901	4	9	0.444	Second round / Group G–H

Source: Results

Date		Score		Set 1	Set 2	Set 3	Set 4	Set 5	Total
13 Nov	China	3–1	Pakistan	20–25	25–13	25–19	25–15		95–72
14 Nov	Pakistan	2–3	Thailand	19–25	30–28	20–25	25–18	13–15	107–111
16 Nov	Chinese Taipei	2–3	Pakistan	18–25	25–21	25–18	22–25	12–15	102–104

==== Group G ====
Pos	Team	Pld	W	L	Pts	SPW	SPL	SPR	SW	SL	SR	Qualification
1	Pakistan	3	3	0	6	289	273	1.059	9	4	2.250	Placement 9–12
2	Chinese Taipei	3	2	1	5	252	206	1.223	8	3	2.667	Placement 9–12
3	Indonesia	3	1	2	4	275	293	0.939	5	8	0.625	Placement 13–16
4	Turkmenistan	3	0	3	3	220	264	0.833	2	9	0.222	Placement 13–16

Source: Results

Date		Score		Set 1	Set 2	Set 3	Set 4	Set 5	Total
16 Nov	Chinese Taipei	2–3	Pakistan	18–25	25–21	25–18	22–25	12–15	102–104
19 Nov	Pakistan	3–0	Turkmenistan	25–19	25–19	27–25			77–63
20 Nov	Pakistan	3–2	Indonesia	25–22	23–25	20–25	25–23	15–13	108–108

==== Placement ====
9th to 12th
21 November
Pakistan	3
Kuwait	0
21 November
Kazakhstan	3
Chinese Taipei	2

9th place
23 November
Pakistan	0
Kazakhstan	3
11th place
23 November
Kuwait	0
Chinese Taipei	3

===== 9th–12th-place semifinals =====
Date		Score		Set 1	Set 2	Set 3	Set 4	Set 5	Total
21 Nov	Pakistan	3–0	Kuwait	27–25	25–21	25–21			

===== 9th-place game =====
Date		Score		Set 1	Set 2	Set 3	Set 4	Set 5	Total
23 Nov	Pakistan	0–3	Kazakhstan	21–25	22–25	29–31			72–81

== Weightlifting ==
=== Men ===
Athlete	Event	Weights Lifted		Total Lifted	Rank
Athlete	Event	Snatch	Clean & Jerk	Total Lifted	Rank
Abdullah Ghafoor	56 kg	99	125	224	12
Mati - ur - Rehman	69 kg	120	152	272	13

== Wrestling ==
=== Freestyle – Men ===
Competitor(s)	Event	1/8 match	Opponent	Quarterfinals	Opponent
Azhar Hussain	55 kg	1–3	(China) Hua Chen	--	
Muhammad Ali	66 kg	0–3	(China) Chengde Shan	--	
Muhammad Inam	84 kg	3–1	(Japan) Atsushi Matsumoto	0–3	(Kazakhstan) Yermek Baiduashov

Officials
Coach	(Iran) Gholam Reza Moazzen

== Wushu ==
=== Men ===
Competitor(s)	Event	Round of 16	Opponent	Quarterfinals	Opponent	Semifinals	Opponent	Final	Opponent	Rank
Syed Maratab Ali Shah	Sanshou (60 kg)	AV	(India) Bimoljit Singh		---		---		---	
Maaz Khan	Sanshou (65 kg)			0–2	(South Korea) Hyun Chang-Ho		---		---	
Kamran Khalid	Sanshou (70 kg)	0–2	(Iran) Sajjad Abbasi		---		---		---	
Ijaz Ahmed	Sanshou (75 kg)	–		2–1	(Turkmenistan) Serdar Mamedov	2–0	(Mongolia) Batjargal Magsarjav	0–2	(Iran) Hamidreza Gholipour	Silver medal

== See also ==
- 2010 Asian Games
