= Bangladesh at the 2006 Asian Games =

- IOC code: BAN
- NOC: Bangladesh Olympic Association

in Doha
- Competitors: 74
- Medals Ranked 36th: Gold 0 Silver 0 Bronze 1 Total 1

Asian Games appearances (overview)
- 1978; 1982; 1986; 1990; 1994; 1998; 2002; 2006; 2010; 2014; 2018; 2022; 2026

Bangladesh participated in the 2006 Asian Games held in Doha, Qatar, with a total of 73 athletes (64 men, 7 women) in twelve different sports. Bangladesh won a bronze medal in Kabaddi and was ranked 36th in a three-way tie with Afghanistan and Yemen in the medal standings.

== Medalists ==
Medal	Name	Sport	Event	Date
Bronze	Md Mizanur Rahman; Kazi Yunus Ahmed; Md Abdur Rouf; Abu Salah Musa; Razu Ahmed; Mosharrof Hossain; Kamal Hossain; Abul Kalam; Badsha Miah; Md Bozlur Rashid; Ziaur Rahman Ziaur; Md Mozammal Haque Haque	Kabaddi	Men's kabaddi	6

== See also ==
- Bangladesh at the Asian Games
- Bangladesh at the Olympics
