= Bangladesh at the 2007 Asian Indoor Games =

- IOC code: BAN
- NOC: Bangladesh Olympic Association

in Macau
- Competitors: 12
- Medals Ranked 29th: Gold 0 Silver 0 Bronze 1 Total 1

Asian Indoor Games appearances
- 2007; 2009; 2013; 2017; 2021; 2026

Bangladesh participated in the 2007 Asian Indoor Games which were held in Macau, China from 26 October to 3 November 2007.

== Medalists ==
Medal	Name	Sport	Event
Bronze	National team: Ziaur Rahman Al Mamun Abu Salah Musa Mohammed Mozammal Haque Enamul Haque Kamal Hossain Bozlur Rashid Rabiul Islam Abdul Kader Sadaqul Islam	Kabaddi	Men's Team
