= Pakistan at the 2006 Asian Games =

- IOC code: PAK
- NOC: Pakistan Olympic Association

in Doha
- Competitors: 387
- Medals Ranked 31st: Gold 0 Silver 1 Bronze 3 Total 4

Asian Games appearances (overview)
- 1954; 1958; 1962; 1966; 1970; 1974; 1978; 1982; 1986; 1990; 1994; 1998; 2002; 2006; 2010; 2014; 2018; 2022; 2026

Pakistan competed in the 2006 Asian Games held in Doha, Qatar, from 1 to 15 December 2006. It ranked 31st on the medals table, winning a total of four medals, a silver in Kabaddi and a bronze each in Field hockey, Squash and Wushu.

== Medalists ==
Medal	Name	Sport	Event	Date
Silver	Muhammad Akram; Nasir Ali; Badshah Gul; Wajid Ali; Waseem Sajjad; Muhammad Arshad; Maqsood Ali; Rahat Maqsood; Naveel Akram; Abrar Khan; Faryad Ali; Faisal Qadeer	Kabaddi	Men	6
Bronze	Salman Akbar; Zeeshan Ashraf; Ihsanullah Khan; Imran Khan Yousafzai; Adnan Maqsood; Sajjad Anwar; Tariq Aziz; Rashid Imran; Shakeel Abbasi; Rehan Butt; Muhammad Zubair; Nasir Ahmed; Imran Ali Warsi; Muhammad Imran; Muhammad Waqas; Muhammad Mudassar	Field hockey	Men	14
Bronze	Mansoor Zaman	Squash	Men's singles	14
Bronze	Maratab Ali	Wushu	Men's sanda 65 kg	14

== Kabaddi ==
Gold Medal Match - December 6

India	35–23	Pakistan

== Weightlifting ==
Athlete	Event	Snatch		Clean & Jerk		Total	Rank	
Athlete	Event	Result	Rank	Result	Rank	Total	Rank	
Men	Usman Akbar	56 kg	95	13	112	13	207	13
Awais Akbar	77 kg	128	11	160	11	288	11	
Shujauddin Malik	85 kg	145	7	188	6	333	6	
Hassan Aslam	94 kg	140	9	170	9	310	9	
Sajjad Amin Malik	105 kg	147	9	175	9	322	9	

== Football ==
Pos	Team	Pld	W	D	L	GF	GA	GD	Pts
1	North Korea	3	2	1	0	3	1	+2	7
2	Japan	3	2	0	1	5	4	+1	6
3	Syria	3	1	1	1	2	1	+1	4
4	Pakistan	3	0	0	3	2	6	−4	0

Source: RSSSF
November 29, 2006
17:15

Japan	3–2	Pakistan
Honda 2'; Taniguchi 32', 57'		Rasool 61'; Akram 82'

Qatar SC Stadium
Attendance: 207
Referee: Ranjith Muhandiram Arachchilage (Sri Lanka)

December 3, 2006
19:45

North Korea	1–0	Pakistan
Kim Chol-Ho 53'

Qatar SC Stadium
Referee: Marat Ismailov (Uzbekistan)

December 6, 2006
17:15

Syria	2–0	Pakistan
Al Said 41', 89'

Grand Hamad Stadium
Referee: Jaafar Mahfoodh (Bahrain)

== Squash ==
- (bronze) Men's singles - Mansoor Zaman

== Wushu ==
- (bronze) - Sanshou -65 kg - Syed Maratab Ali Shah
