= Indoor kabaddi at the 2009 Asian Indoor Games =

- Venue: Cầu Giấy Gymnasium
- Dates: 2–6 November 2009

Indoor kabaddi was contested by seven teams at the 2009 Asian Indoor Games in Hanoi, Vietnam from 2 November to 6 November. The competition took place at the Cầu Giấy Gymnasium.

India won the gold medal after beating Iran in the final.

== Medalists ==
Event	Gold	Silver	Bronze
Men	India; Navneet Gautam; Jasvir Singh; Anup Kumar; Samarjeet; Manjeet Chhillar; Vikram Singh Patil; Rakesh Kumar	Iran; Mohammad Bagher Mazandarani; Nasser Roumiani; Reza Kamali Moghaddam; Ehsan Zamani; Ramezan Ali Paeinmahalli; Mostafa Nodehi; Farhad Kamal Gharibi	Bangladesh; Al Mamun; Kamal Hossain; Maftun Haque; Abu Salah Musa; Abdul Kader; Mohammad Firozzaman; Aruduzzaman Munshi
Men	India; Navneet Gautam; Jasvir Singh; Anup Kumar; Samarjeet; Manjeet Chhillar; Vikram Singh Patil; Rakesh Kumar	Iran; Mohammad Bagher Mazandarani; Nasser Roumiani; Reza Kamali Moghaddam; Ehsan Zamani; Ramezan Ali Paeinmahalli; Mostafa Nodehi; Farhad Kamal Gharibi	Sri Lanka; Duminda Padma Kumara; Indika Sanath Kumara; Sajith Indra Kumara; Wasantha Kumara Gnanarthage; Mahesh Nalinda Ranjith; Kapila Bandara; Anuruddika de Silva

== Results ==
=== Round 1 ===
==== Group A ====
Pos	Team	Pld	W	D	L	PF	PA	PD	Pts
1	India	3	3	0	0	188	75	+113	6
2	Sri Lanka	3	2	0	1	122	140	−18	4
3	South Korea	3	1	0	2	146	140	+6	2
4	Vietnam	3	0	0	3	103	204	−101	0

Source: Official website

2 November
9:00

Sri Lanka	46–44 (HT: 19–29)	South Korea

Cầu Giấy Gymnasium, Hanoi

2 November
16:10

India	71–30 (HT: 38–10)	Vietnam

Cầu Giấy Gymnasium, Hanoi

3 November
15:00

India	57–26 (HT: 34–8)	South Korea

Cầu Giấy Gymnasium, Hanoi

3 November
17:00

Sri Lanka	57–36 (HT: 29–17)	Vietnam

Cầu Giấy Gymnasium, Hanoi

4 November
15:00

South Korea	76–37 (HT: 36–17)	Vietnam

Cầu Giấy Gymnasium, Hanoi

4 November
17:00

India	60–19 (HT: 32–8)	Sri Lanka

Cầu Giấy Gymnasium, Hanoi

==== Group B ====
Pos	Team	Pld	W	D	L	PF	PA	PD	Pts
1	Iran	3	3	0	0	199	72	+127	6
2	Bangladesh	3	2	0	1	163	151	+12	4
3	Thailand	3	1	0	2	157	171	−14	2
4	Malaysia	3	0	0	3	114	239	−125	0

Source: Official website

2 November
10:45

Bangladesh	75–50 (HT: 37–24)	Malaysia

Cầu Giấy Gymnasium, Hanoi

2 November
17:15

Iran	68–23 (HT: 35–10)	Thailand

Cầu Giấy Gymnasium, Hanoi

3 November
16:00

Iran	80–19 (HT: 41–11)	Malaysia

Cầu Giấy Gymnasium, Hanoi

3 November
18:00

Bangladesh	58–50 (HT: 29–22)	Thailand

Cầu Giấy Gymnasium, Hanoi

4 November
16:00

Malaysia	45–84 (HT: 21–44)	Thailand

Cầu Giấy Gymnasium, Hanoi

4 November
18:00

Iran	51–30 (HT: 25–15)	Bangladesh

Cầu Giấy Gymnasium, Hanoi

=== Knockout round ===
Semifinals
5 November
India	59
Bangladesh	18
5 November
Iran	61
Sri Lanka	19

Final
6 November
India	57
Iran	33

==== Semifinals ====
5 November
16:00

India	59–18 (HT: 31–10)	Bangladesh

Cầu Giấy Gymnasium, Hanoi

5 November
17:00

Iran	61–19 (HT: 38–7)	Sri Lanka

Cầu Giấy Gymnasium, Hanoi

==== Final ====
6 November
16:00

India	57–33 (HT: 32–16)	Iran

Cầu Giấy Gymnasium, Hanoi
