= Bangladesh at the 2009 Asian Indoor Games =

- IOC code: BAN
- NOC: Bangladesh Olympic Association

in Hanoi
- Competitors: 7 in 1 sport
- Medals Ranked 31st: Gold 0 Silver 0 Bronze 1 Total 1

Asian Indoor Games appearances
- 2007; 2009; 2013; 2017; 2021; 2025

Bangladesh participated in the 2009 Asian Indoor Games in Hanoi, Vietnam on 30 October – 8 November 2009. It won one bronze medal.

== Medal winners ==
Medal	Name	Sport	Event	Date
Bronze	Abdul Kader Md; Abu Salah Musa; Al Mamum Mamun; Kamal Hossain; Md Arbuzzaman Munshi; Md Mfatun Haque; Md Shapan Khan	Kabaddi	Men's Team kabaddi	
