= Abdur Rouf (kabaddi) =

Bangladeshi kabaddi player

Medal record

Men's Kabaddi

Asian Games
Bronze medal – third place	2006 Doha	Team

Md Abdur Rouf (Bengali: মোঃ আব্দুর রউফ ; born 1 June 1974) is a Bangladeshi kabaddi player who was part of the team that won the bronze medal at the 2006 Asian Games.
