= Kabaddi at the 2002 Asian Games =

- Venue: Tongmyong University
- Dates: 4–7 October 2002
- Competitors: 68 from 6 nations

Kabaddi was contested at the 2002 Asian Games in Busan, South Korea from October 4 to October 7. The competition took place at the Tongmyong University.

Six teams competed in a round robin competition. In case of tie, the teams classified according to their points difference against the teams which scored more than 25% of the league points.

== Schedule ==
●	Round	●	Last round

Event↓/Date →	4th Fri	5th Sat	6th Sun	7th Mon
Men	●	●	●	●

== Medalists ==
Event	Gold	Silver	Bronze
Men	India; Ram Mehar Singh; Shamsher Singh; Neer Gulia; B. C. Ramesh; Manpreet Singh; Ramesh Kumar; Sunder Singh; Jagdish Kumble; B. C. Suresh; K. K. Jagdeesha; Dinesh Kumar; Sanjeev Kumar	Bangladesh; Badsha Miah; Jahidul Islam; Deolwar Hossain; Ziaur Rahman; Rabiul Islam; Al Mamun; Tariqul Islam; Kamal Hossain; Bashir Ahmad; Mollah Tauhidul Islam; Enamul Haque; Rezaul Islam	Pakistan; Muhammad Mansha; Tariq Hussain; Zubair Ahmed; Muhammad Akram Shakar; Mukhtar Ahmed; Muhammad Latif; Badshah Gul; Muhammad Saleem; Noor Akbar; Muhammad Akram

== Squads ==
Squads

Bangladesh	India	Japan	Malaysia
Badsha Miah; Jahidul Islam; Deolwar Hossain; Ziaur Rahman; Rabiul Islam; Al Mamun; Tariqul Islam; Kamal Hossain; Bashir Ahmad; Mollah Tauhidul Islam; Enamul Haque; Rezaul Islam	Ram Mehar Singh; Shamsher Singh; Neer Gulia; B. C. Ramesh; Manpreet Singh; Ramesh Kumar; Sunder Singh; Jagdish Kumble; B. C. Suresh; K. K. Jagdeesha; Dinesh Kumar; Sanjeev Kumar	Terukazu Nitta; Kazuaki Murakami; Tatsuhiko Yamada; Yoshinori Suga; Shojun Shimizutani; Ryoki Nishioka; Yoji Kawai; Kokei Ito; Koji Matsuhashi; Shogen Kamine; Masayuki Ota; Tetsuya Itagaki	Anatharaju Keresnan; Mahendran Kannaiah; Sivabalan Ramachandram; Thanaraj Sivelingam; Sivanesh Rajendran; Nagarajan Rajamanickam; Kumaresan Subramani; Mohanatas Balakerisnan; Rajendran Ramakrishnan; Balamurugan Rengasami Naidu; Balakrishnan Arumugam; Paramasiven Muniandy
Pakistan	Sri Lanka		
Muhammad Mansha; Tariq Hussain; Zubair Ahmed; Muhammad Akram Shakar; Mukhtar Ahmed; Muhammad Latif; Badshah Gul; Muhammad Saleem; Noor Akbar; Muhammad Akram	Ruwan Kariyawasam Saputhathri; Indika Sanath Kumara; Patabandige Thushara; Wimal Rohana; Paragahawaththage Priyantha; Juwan Waduge; Susantha Mahesh; Ruwan Sampath; Pathiranage Weeraratne; Kapila Bandara		

== Results ==
All times are Korea Standard Time (UTC+09:00)

Pos	Team	Pld	W	D	L	PF	PA	PD	Pts
1	India	5	5	0	0	224	84	+140	10
2	Bangladesh	5	3	0	2	174	91	+83	6 (Note: Match points difference against the teams which scored 25% or more of the league points: BAN +4, PAK −55.)
3	Pakistan	5	3	0	2	87	106	−19	6
4	Japan	5	2	0	3	83	107	−24	4
5	Malaysia	5	1	0	4	65	145	−80	2 (Note: Match points difference against the teams which scored 25% or more of the league points: MAS −78, SRI −102.)
6	Sri Lanka	5	1	0	4	64	164	−100	2

Source: Report
Notes:

4 October
10:00

Japan	23–4 (HT: 5–3)	Sri Lanka

Tongmyong University, Busan

4 October
11:00

India	47–21 (HT: 32–9)	Malaysia

Tongmyong University, Busan

4 October
14:00

Bangladesh	44–10 (HT: 13–1)	Pakistan

Tongmyong University, Busan

4 October
15:00

India	53–21 (HT: 39–3)	Japan

Tongmyong University, Busan

5 October
10:00

Pakistan	20–6 (HT: 6–2)	Sri Lanka

Tongmyong University, Busan

5 October
11:00

Bangladesh	14–37 (HT: 7–24)	India

Tongmyong University, Busan

5 October
14:00

Japan	12–21 (HT: 0–3)	Pakistan

Tongmyong University, Busan

5 October
15:00

Bangladesh	46–7 (HT: 12–2)	Malaysia

Tongmyong University, Busan

6 October
14:00

Malaysia	16–18 (HT: 3–13)	Sri Lanka

Tongmyong University, Busan

6 October
15:00

Bangladesh	15–22 (HT: 3–4)	Japan

Tongmyong University, Busan

6 October
16:00

Malaysia	7–29 (HT: 4–11)	Pakistan

Tongmyong University, Busan

6 October
17:00

India	50–21 (HT: 27–6)	Sri Lanka

Tongmyong University, Busan

7 October
10:00

Japan	5–14 (HT: 0–0)	Malaysia

Tongmyong University, Busan

7 October
11:00

Bangladesh	55–15 (HT: 30–5)	Sri Lanka

Tongmyong University, Busan

7 October
14:00

India	37–7 (HT: 23–4)	Pakistan

Tongmyong University, Busan

== Final standing ==
Rank	Team	Pld	W	D	L
1st place, gold medalist(s)	India	5	5	0	0
2nd place, silver medalist(s)	Bangladesh	5	3	0	2
3rd place, bronze medalist(s)	Pakistan	5	3	0	2
4	Japan	5	2	0	3
5	Malaysia	5	1	0	4
6	Sri Lanka	5	1	0	4
