= Champa Thakur =

Indian kabaddi player (born 2004)

Personal information
- Nationality: Indian
- Born: November 4, 2004 (age 21) Bageigarh, Chamba district, Himachal Pradesh, India

Sport
- Sport: Kabaddi
- Position: Left-corner defender
- Team: India women's national kabaddi team

Champa Thakur (born 4 November 2004) is an Indian kabaddi player from Himachal Pradesh. She plays for the India women's national kabaddi team and for Himachal Pradesh in domestic tournaments. She is a left corner defender.

== Early life ==
Champa Thakur was born on 4 November 2002 in Bageigarh, Chamba district, Himachal Pradesh, India. Her father, Ramesh Kumar, is a wrestling coach, and her mother Noradevi is a tailoring teacher. Her brother, Sumit Thakur, is also an athlete and wrestler.

== Career ==
Thakur began playing kabaddi in 2015 at the age of 11. During her early years, she started with wrestling but due to lack of facilities her father encouraged her to focus on kabaddi. Her first coach was Kuldeep Rajput, under whom she learnt her basics. She also trained under Thakur Das Verma and others. In 2017, she joined Sports Authority of India (SAI) hostel at Dharamshala where she trains under coaches Pankaj Kumar and Satveer Kaur.

In 2025, at the age of 20, Thakur made her international debut at the 2nd Women's Kabaddi World Cup 2025 held at Dhaka, Bangladesh, from 17 to 24 November 2025 where India won the gold medal. On her return to Himachal Pradesh, she received a grand welcome.

In 2024, in the JSG Women's Yuva Kabaddi Series she represented Himalayan Tahrs. In 2024, she also played the Junior National in Hyderabad.

== See also ==
- India women's national kabaddi team
- Kabaddi in India
