= Rambir Singh Sangwan =

Indian police officer and kabaddi player

Ram Bir Singh is an Assistant Commandant in the India Border Security Force and was a member of the India national kabaddi team that won an Asiad gold medal in 1998.
