= Sri Lanka national kabaddi team =

National kabaddi team of Sri Lanka

Sri Lanka
- Association: Sri Lanka Kabaddi Federation
- Confederation: Asian Kabaddi Federation (AKF)
- Head Coach: Anura Pathirana
- Captain: Milinda Chathuranga

World Cup
- 1 (first in 2007)
- Quarter-finals (2007)

Asian Games
- 3 (first in 1998)
- 4th (1998)

Asian Championship
- 7 (first in 1980)
- (silver) 2nd (2000)
Medal record
Event	1st	2nd	3rd
Asian Championship	0	1	1
Asian Indoor Games	0	0	1
Asian Beach Games	0	0	4
Commonwealth Championship	0	1	0
South Asian Games	0	1	2
Total	0	3	8

Sri Lanka national kabaddi team represents Sri Lanka in international men's kabaddi. Governed by the Sri Lanka Kabaddi Federation, the team has won silver medals at the 2019 South Asian Games and at the inaugural 2026 Commonwealth Kabaddi Championship, and bronze medals at four editions of the beach kabaddi event at the Asian Beach Games (2012, 2014, 2016 and 2026).

== History ==
Sri Lanka made its Asian Games kabaddi debut at the 1998 Asian Games in Bangkok, finishing fourth, its best result at the Games, and finished sixth at the 2002 Asian Games. The team returned for the 2018 Asian Games in Jakarta, where it did not win a medal. Sri Lanka did not enter the men's tournament at the 2026 Asian Games, where ten other nations competed.

At the South Asian Games, Sri Lanka won its first international kabaddi medal, a bronze, in 1999, a second bronze in 2016, and silver in 2019 after losing the final 51–18 to India.

In April 2026 Sri Lanka's men won a bronze medal in beach kabaddi at the 2026 Asian Beach Games in Sanya. In Group B Sri Lanka beat Thailand 43–29 and lost 54–33 to India; it then lost the semi-final 42–29 to Iran, which won the title, and was awarded bronze together with Pakistan.

At the inaugural 2026 Commonwealth Kabaddi Championship in Ahmedabad in October 2026, Sri Lanka lost 24–45 to India and beat Tanzania 48–21 and Uganda 36–34 in Group A, then beat Kenya 28–24 in the semi-final on 30 October to reach the final. It lost the final to India 54–20 on 31 October and took the silver medal.

== Tournament records ==
=== Asian Games ===
Year	Rank
(China) 1990	Did not enter
(Japan) 1994	Did not enter
(Thailand) 1998	4th
(South Korea) 2002	6th
(Qatar) 2006	Did not enter
(China) 2010	Did not enter
(South Korea) 2014	Did not enter
(Indonesia) 2018	Participated, no medal
(China) 2022	Did not enter
(Japan) 2026	Did not enter

=== Commonwealth Kabaddi Championship ===
Commonwealth Kabaddi Championship
Year	Host city	Position
2026	Ahmedabad, India	(silver) 2nd

==== 2026 Commonwealth Championship results ====
Date	Round	Opponent	Score
—	Group A	India	24–45
—	Group A	Tanzania	48–21
—	Group A	Uganda	36–34
30 October 2026	Semi-final	Kenya	28–24
31 October 2026	Final	India	20–54

=== Asian Indoor Games ===
Year	Rank
2007	Group stage
2009	Semi-final (Bronze medal)

=== World Cup ===
Year	Rank
(India) 2007	Quarter-finals

=== South Asian Games ===
Year	Rank	Notes
1999	Third place	First international medal for Sri Lanka (Nilantha Weerasingha, Mangala Pushpakumara, HPMC Lakmal Somarathna, KPT Thushara, K Meegasthenna, Lalith, Indika Kumara, MLP Mendis, GG Samantha, Lalantha)
2016	Third place	
2019	Runners-up	Lost the final 51–18 to India; first silver for Sri Lanka in kabaddi at the Games

=== Asian Beach Games ===
Year	Rank
2008	Group stage
2010	Group stage
2012	Semi-final (Bronze medal)
2014	Semi-final (Bronze medal)
2016	Semi-final (Bronze medal)
2026	Semi-final (Bronze medal); lost 42–29 to Iran

== Recent results ==
Event	Dates	Venue	Result
Commonwealth Kabaddi Championship	23–31 October 2026	Ahmedabad, India	Runners-up (lost to India 54–20 in final)
Asian Beach Games	22–30 April 2026	Sanya, China	Bronze (lost semi-final to Iran 42–29)

== See also ==
- Kabaddi at the Asian Games
- Beach kabaddi at the Asian Beach Games
- Sri Lanka women's national kabaddi team
