= Nawaz Dad Khan =

Pakistani boxer (born 1985)

Personal information
- Nationality: Pakistani
- Born: 05/08/1985 Pakistan
- Weight: 60 kg (132 lb)

Boxing career

Nawaz Dad Khan (born on 5 August 1985) is a national boxer of Pakistan. He played many international matches and won medals. He also played the boxing at the 2010 Asian Games by Lightweight(60 kg).

== See also ==
- Pakistan at the 2010 Asian Games
