= Muhammad Khalid (kabaddi) =

Pakistani kabaddi player

Medal record

Representing Pakistan

Men's Kabaddi

Asian Games
Bronze medal – third place	2010 Guangzhou	Team

Muhammad Khalid (born 12 December 1982) is a Pakistani professional international Kabaddi player. He was a member of the bronze-winning Pakistan national kabaddi team at the Asian Games in 2010 in Guangzhou.
