= Global Indian Pravasi Kabaddi League =

Kabaddi tournament in India

- Sport: Kabaddi
- Founded: 2024
- First season: 2025
- Owner: Holistic International Pravasi Sports Association (HIPSA)
- No. of teams: 12 (6 men's, 6 women's)
- Country: India
- Continent: Asia
- Broadcasters: Sony Sports Network, FanCode DD Sports, Waves

Global Indian Pravasi Kabaddi League (GI-PKL) is a professional kabaddi league in India, organized by the Holistic International Pravasi Sports Association (HIPSA). Launched on April 18, 2025, in Gurugram, Haryana, the league features 12 teams, comprising six men's and six women's teams, each representing regional identities of India. The inaugural season, broadcast on Sony Sports Network and FanCode, DD Sports and on Waves and it was concluded on April 30, 2025, with Marathi Vultures winning the men's title, Tamil Lioness winning the women's title, and Tamil Lioness also receiving the Championship Trophy.

== History ==
The GI-PKL was established and organised in April 2025 by Holistic International Pravasi Sports Association (HIPSA) aiming to create a unified platform for men's and women's kabaddi. HIPSA, the organizing body, sought to promote kabaddi globally, with participation from international players from countries including Egypt, Kenya, Argentina, Germany, England, Norway, Poland, Hungary, and Hong Kong.

In March 2024, HIPSA organized a Guinness World Records event at Tau Devilal Stadium in Panchkula, Haryana, attended by the Governor of Haryana, Bandaru Dattatreya, to promote kabaddi. The league's formation was supported by the Haryana government, which signed memoranda of understanding with HIPSA to advance the sport.

== Format and Teams ==
The GI-PKL consists of 12 teams, with each franchise owning both a men's and a women's team, competing on the same mat size to promote gender equality. The teams are named to reflect regional identities, with the league's tagline "#KabaddiKiNayiJung" symbolizing its innovative approach.

=== Men's Teams ===
- Marathi Vultures – Captain: Kapil Narwal
- Bhojpuri Leopards – Captain: Shiv Prashad
- Telugu Panthers – Captain: Sandeep Kandola
- Tamil Lions – Captain: Sunil Narwal
- Punjabi Tigers – Captain: Sawin Narwal
- Haryanvi Sharks – Captain: Vikash Dahiya

=== Women's Teams ===
- Marathi Falcons – Captain: Tanu Sharma
- Bhojpuri Leopardess – Captain: Meena Kadyan
- Telugu Cheetahs – Captain: Julie Bhati
- Tamil Lioness – Captain: Suman
- Punjabi Tigress – Captain: Meera
- Haryanvi Eagles – Captain: Pushpa Rana

The league operates with a league stage followed by semi-finals and finals, with a single Championship Trophy awarded to the team with the best overall performance.

== Inaugural Season ==
The inaugural season ran from April 18 to April 30, 2025, at Gurugram University, with 36 matches played over 13 days. The season was inaugurated by Haryana Sports Minister Gaurav Gautam, with attendees including D. Suresh, IAS, and former Indian kabaddi captain Deepak Hooda. The men's competition began on April 18, followed by the women's on April 19, with semi-finals on April 28 (men) and April 29 (women), and finals on April 30.

Notable early matches included:

- Men's (April 18): Punjabi Tigers defeated Tamil Lions 33–31; Haryanvi Sharks defeated Telugu Panthers 47–43; Marathi Vultures defeated Bhojpuri Leopards 42–21.
- Women's (April 19): Telugu Cheetahs defeated Marathi Falcons 42–28; Punjabi Tigress defeated Bhojpuri Leopardess 41–21; Tamil Lioness defeated Haryanvi Eagles 44–18.

In the women's semi-finals on April 29, Tamil Lioness defeated Bhojpuri Leopardess 43–21, and Telugu Cheetahs defeated Punjabi Tigress 25–16. In the men's semi-finals, Marathi Vultures and Tamil Lions advanced to the final.

The finals took place on April 30, 2025. In the men's final, Marathi Vultures defeated Tamil Lions 40–30, with captain Sunil Narwal leading with 17 tackle points. In the women's final, Tamil Lioness defeated Telugu Cheetahs 31–19, earning 14 tackle points and four all-out points. Tamil Lioness also won the Championship Trophy for their overall performance, having topped the league stage.

== Impact and Reception ==
The GI-PKL has been recognized for its focus on gender equality and international participation, with players from countries such as Poland, Hungary, and England expressing enthusiasm for the league's role in globalizing kabaddi. The inaugural season attracted significant viewership and social media engagement, with packed arenas and live broadcasts on five platforms, including Sony Sports Network and FanCode. A digital campaign in Times Square, New York, further enhanced the league's global visibility. The Haryana government's support, including the involvement of Sports Minister Gaurav Gautam and Union Minister Krishan Pal Gurjar, who presented the trophies, underscored the league's regional significance. HIPSA President Kanthi D. Suresh stated the league aims to support kabaddi's inclusion in the Olympics. Following Season 1, HIPSA announced plans for a franchise-based model for Season 2, expected in early 2026, to ensure sustainability and enhance fan engagement.
