= Ramesh Kumar (kabaddi) =

Indian kabaddi player

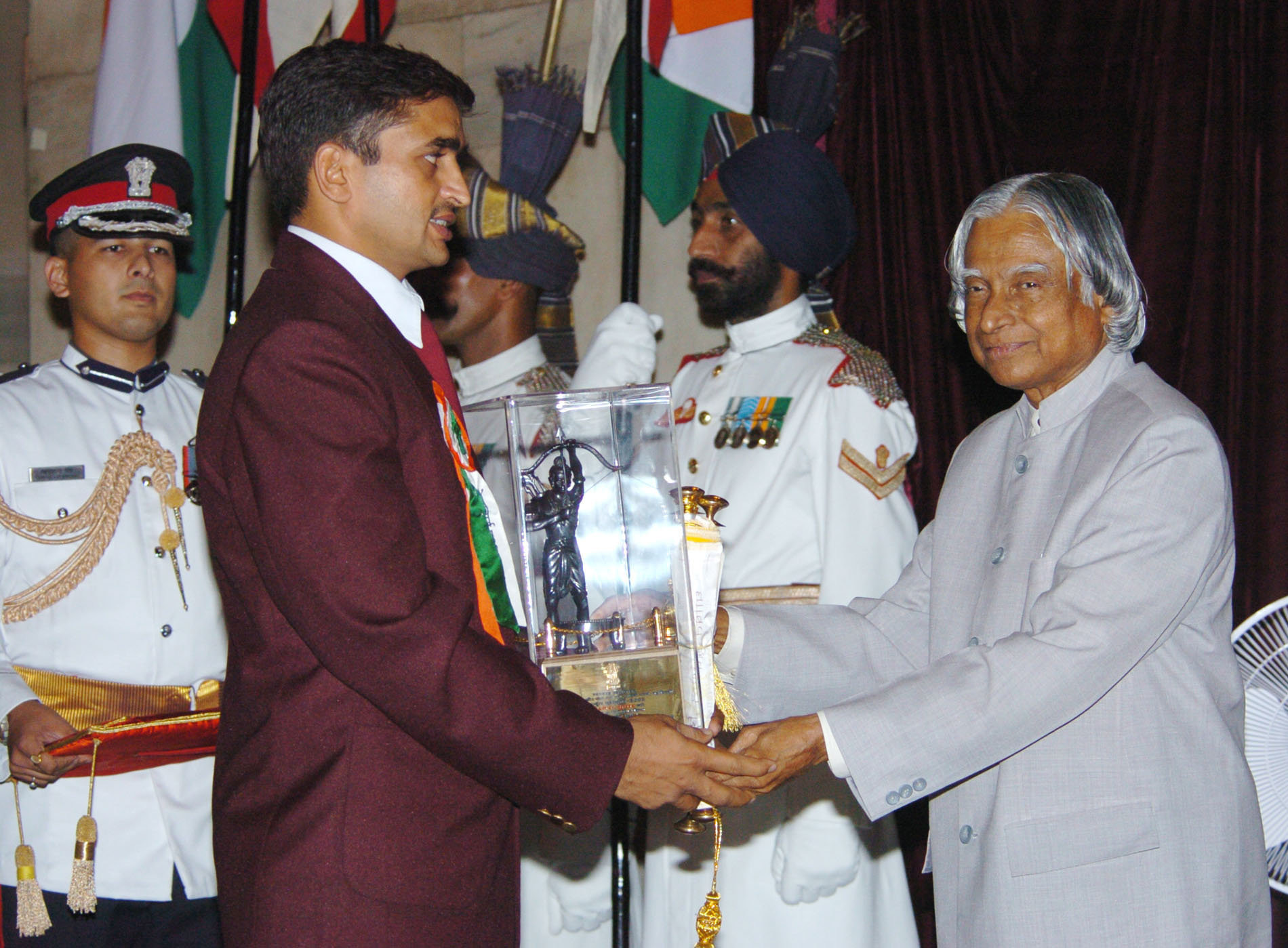
- Kumar (left) receiving Arjuna award in 2006 from president A. P. J. Abdul Kalam

Personal information
- Nationality: Indian
- Citizenship: Indian
- Born: Kirmara village, Hisar district, Haryana
- Employer: Haryana Police

Sport
- Country: India
- Sport: Kabaddi
- Team: India men's national kabaddi team
Medal record
Representing India
World Cup
Gold medal – first place	2004 Mumbai	Team
Asian Games
Gold medal – first place	2002 Busan	Team
Gold medal – first place	2006 Doha	Team

Ramesh Kumar is an Indian professional Kabaddi player. He was part of the teams which won gold medal at 2002 Asian Games, 2006 Asian Games, and the 2004 Kabaddi World Cup. In 2005, government of India conferred Arjuna Award on him for his achievements in the sport.

Hailing from Kirmara village of Haryana state's Hisar district, Kumar started playing kabaddi in 1992 and was selected for the senior state team of Haryana in 1995. Between 2004 and 2006, he served as captain of the Indian national team for three years. In 2008, government of Haryana appointed him as an inspector in the state police.
