= Malaysia national kabaddi team =

Malaysian men's national kabaddi team

Malaysia
- Association: Malaysian Kabaddi Federation
- Confederation: Asian Kabaddi Federation (AKF)
- Head Coach: Engaittaraman Padmanathan

World Cup
- 2 (first in 2004)
- Quarter-finals (2007)

Asian Games
- 6 (first in 2002)
- 5th (2002, 2014)

Asian Championship
- 6 (first in 1980)
- (silver) 2nd (2003)

The Malaysia national kabaddi team represents Malaysia in international men's kabaddi competitions and is controlled by the Malaysian Kabaddi Federation. (Note: Not to be confused with "Malaysia Kabaddi Federation" (MKF), established in 2011 and affiliated to World Kabaddi.) Engaittaraman Padmanathan acts as the team manager. The team's best results are a quarter-final place at the 2007 Kabaddi World Cup and fifth place at the 2002 and 2014 Asian Games.

== History ==
Malaysia first played in the World Cup in 2004, losing all three group matches, and reached the quarter-finals in 2007. It made its Asian Games debut at the 2002 Asian Games in Busan, finishing fifth, and has since played in 2010, 2014, 2018 and 2022. Malaysia hosted the 2002 and 2003 editions of the Asian Kabaddi Championship; it was runners-up in 2003.

At the 2026 Asian Games in Aichi–Nagoya, Malaysia lost all four Group B matches, 22–65 to Pakistan, 23–66 to Thailand, 33–67 to Iran and 52–73 to Nepal, finishing last in the group and ninth overall.

Malaysia also played in the inaugural 2026 Commonwealth Kabaddi Championship in Ahmedabad in October 2026. In Group A it lost 29–45 to Uganda, 28–50 to Sri Lanka and 23–37 to India, then beat Tanzania 43–26, England 55–29 and Nigeria 78–13, finishing fourth with three wins from six matches and missing the semi-finals.

== Tournament records ==
=== World Cup ===
Year	Rank	Pld	W	D	L
(India) 2004	Group Stage	3	0	0	3
(India) 2007	Quarter-Finals	3	2	0	1
(India) 2016	Did not participate				
Total	2/3	6	2	0	4

=== Asian Games ===
Year	Rank	M	W	D	L	PF	PA	PD
(China) 1990	Did not enter	–	–	–	–	–	–	–
(Japan) 1994	Did not enter	–	–	–	–	–	–	–
(Thailand) 1998	Did not enter	–	–	–	–	–	–	–
(South Korea) 2002	5th place	5	1	0	4	65	145	-80
(Qatar) 2006	Did not enter	–	–	–	–	–	–	–
(China) 2010	7th place	3	0	0	3	82	147	-65
(South Korea) 2014	5th place	3	1	0	2	77	113	-36
(Indonesia) 2018	11th place	5	0	0	5	100	209	-109
(China) 2022	11th place	3	1	0	2	98	149	-51
(Japan) 2026	9th place	4	0	0	4	130	271	-141
Total	6/10	23	3	0	20	552	1034	-482

==== 2026 Asian Games results ====
Date	Round	Opponent	Score
21 September 2026	Group B	Pakistan	22–65
22 September 2026	Group B	Thailand	23–66
23 September 2026	Group B	Iran	33–67
24 September 2026	Group B	Nepal	52–73

=== Commonwealth Kabaddi Championship ===
Year	Rank	Pld	W	D	L	PF	PA	PD
(India) 2026	Group stage (4th in Group A)	6	3	0	3	256	200	+56

==== 2026 Commonwealth Championship results ====
Date	Round	Opponent	Score
23 October 2026	Group A	Uganda	29–45
24 October 2026	Group A	Sri Lanka	28–50
25 October 2026	Group A	India	23–37
26 October 2026	Group A	Tanzania	43–26
27 October 2026	Group A	England	55–29
28 October 2026	Group A	Nigeria	78–13

=== Asian Beach Games ===
Year	Rank	Pld	W	D	L
(Indonesia) 2008	Group Stage	4	0	0	4
(Oman) 2010	Did not qualify	–	–	–	–
(China) 2012	Did not enter	–	–	–	–
(Thailand) 2014	Did not enter	–	–	–	–
(Vietnam) 2016	Group Stage	2	0	0	2
(China) 2026	Did not enter	–	–	–	–
Total	2/6	6	0	0	6

== Recent results ==
Event	Dates	Venue	Result
Commonwealth Kabaddi Championship	23–31 October 2026	Ahmedabad, India	Group stage (3 wins, 3 defeats)
Asian Games	21–26 September 2026	Aichi–Nagoya, Japan	Group stage (4 defeats), 9th overall
