= 2007 Kabaddi World Cup (International Kabaddi Federation) =

International kabaddi tournament in India

Tournament information
- Dates: 24 January–26 January
- Administrator: Karnala Sports Academy; International Kabaddi Federation
- Format: Standard style
- Tournament format(s): Round-robin and Knockout
- Host: India
- Venue(s): Panvel, Maharashtra
- Participants: 14

Final positions
- Champions: India (2nd title)
- 1st runners-up: Iran
- 2nd runners-up: Bangladesh; Japan

Tournament statistics
- Matches played: 25

2007 Kabaddi World Cup was the second edition of the Kabaddi World Cup held by the International Kabaddi Federation (IKF). It was organised by Karnala Sports Academy in India. Host India won the World Cup a second time by defeating Iran 29-19 in the final. A total of 14 originally 16 teams took part in the competition out of which 11 were Asian.

== Teams ==
- Afghanistan
- Bangladesh
- India
- Iran
- Italy
- Japan
- ~~Kyrgyzstan~~
- South Korea
- Malaysia
- Nepal
- Sri Lanka
- Thailand
- Turkmenistan
- ~~Pakistan~~
- United Kingdom
- West Indies

== Pools ==
The teams were divided into four pools of four teams each. However, Pakistan and Kyrgyzstan never took part in the tournament.

Pool A	Pool B	Pool C	Pool D
India; ~~Kyrgyzstan~~; Sri Lanka; ~~Pakistan~~	Iran; South Korea; Nepal; United Kingdom	Afghanistan; Bangladesh; Italy; Thailand	Japan; Malaysia; Turkmenistan; West Indies

== Competition format ==
Sixteen teams competed in tournament consisting of two rounds. In the first round, teams were divided into four pools of four teams each, and followed round-robin format with each of the team playing all other teams in the pool once. Following the completion of the league matches, teams placed first and second in each pool advanced to a single elimination round consisting of four quarterfinals, two semifinal games, and a final.

== Schedule ==
All matches' timings were according to Indian Standard Time (UTC +5:30).

=== Knockout stage ===
Quarter-finals
25 January
India	68
Malaysia	21
25 January
Bangladesh	30
Nepal	15
25 January
Iran	34
Thailand	4
25 January
Sri Lanka	20
Japan	31

Semi-finals
26 January
India	48
Bangladesh	22
26 January
Iran	43
Japan	14

Final
26 January
India	29
Iran	19

=== Quarter-finals ===
25 January 2007
18:00

India	68 – 21	Malaysia

Panvel, Maharashtra

25 January 2007
19:00

Bangladesh	30 – 15	Nepal

Panvel, Maharashtra

25 January 2007
18:00

Iran	34 – 04	Thailand

Panvel, Maharashtra

25 January 2007
18:00

Sri Lanka	20 – 31	Japan

Panvel, Maharashtra

=== Semi-final ===
26 January 2007
09:00

India	48 – 22	Bangladesh

Panvel, Maharashtra

26 January 2007
10:00

Iran	43 – 14	Japan

Panvel, Maharashtra

=== Final ===
26 January 2007
18:00

India	29 – 19	Iran

Panvel, Maharashtra

2007 Kabaddi World Cup
1st Runner-up	Champions	2nd Runner-up	
Iran	India (2nd Title)	Bangladesh	Japan
