= Jagdish Kumble =

Indian kabaddi player and coach

Jagdish Kumble is an Indian professional kabaddi player and coach. He coaches the Telugu Titans in the Pro Kabaddi League. He was member of the India national kabaddi team that won Asian games gold medals in 2002 which was held at Busan.He is the only player who won gold medal in kabaddi from Kerala.

Jagdish Kumble runs a kabaddi academy in Kasargod, Kerala
