= Kabaddi at the 2006 Asian Games =

- Venue: Aspire Hall 4
- Dates: 2–6 December 2006
- Competitors: 60 from 5 nations

Kabaddi was contested by five teams at the 2006 Asian Games in Doha, Qatar from December 2 to December 6. The competition took place at the Aspire Hall 4.

== Schedule ==
P	Preliminary round	F	Finals

Event↓/Date →	2nd Sat	3rd Sun	4th Mon	5th Tue	6th Wed
Men	P	P	P	P	F

== Medalists ==
Event	Gold	Silver	Bronze
Men	India; Navneet Gautam; Vikash Kumar; Suresh Kumar; Dinesh Kumar; Manpreet Singh; Ramesh Kumar; Rakesh Kumar; Sukhvir Singh; Naveen Kumar; Gaurav Shetty; Pankaj Shirsat; Rajeev Kumar Singh	Pakistan; Muhammad Akram; Nasir Ali; Badshah Gul; Wajid Ali; Waseem Sajjad; Muhammad Arshad; Maqsood Ali; Rahat Maqsood; Naveel Akram; Abrar Khan; Faryad Ali; Faisal Qadeer	Bangladesh; Ziaur Rahman; Badsha Miah; Kazi Yunus Ahmed; Md Abdur Rouf; Kamal Hossain; Abu Salah Musa; Md Mizanur Rahman; Mozammal Haque; Bozlur Rashid; Mosharrof Hossain; Abul Kalam; Razu Ahmed

== Draw ==
The draw ceremony for the team sports was held on 7 September 2006 at Doha. The teams were seeded based on their final ranking at the 2002 Asian Games.

Group A

- India (1)
- Japan (4)
- ~~Nepal~~*
- Iran

Group B

- Bangladesh (2)
- Pakistan (3)
- ~~Thailand~~*
- ~~Sri Lanka~~*

* The format was changed to five-team round-robin after Nepal, Sri Lanka and Thailand withdrew.

== Squads ==
Squads

Bangladesh	India	Iran	Japan
Ziaur Rahman; Badsha Miah; Kazi Yunus Ahmed; Md Abdur Rouf; Kamal Hossain; Abu Salah Musa; Md Mizanur Rahman; Mozammal Haque; Bozlur Rashid; Mosharrof Hossain; Abul Kalam; Razu Ahmed	Navneet Gautam; Vikash Kumar; Suresh Kumar; Dinesh Kumar; Manpreet Singh; Ramesh Kumar; Rakesh Kumar; Sukhvir Singh; Naveen Kumar; Gaurav Shetty; Pankaj Shirsat; Rajeev Kumar Singh	Mohammad Shabani; Behzad Bamedi; Abdolhamid Maghsoudloo; Ramezan Ali Paeinmahalli; Aref Fojerdi; Farhad Kamal Gharibi; Ali Doustmohammadi; Mostafa Nodehi; Ali Roshanshomal; Hossein Nosrati; Kianoush Naderian; Nasser Roumiani	Terukazu Nitta; Shojun Shimizutani; Tatsuhiko Yamada; Yoshinori Suga; Takeshi Kozu; Kazuaki Murakami; Ryoki Nishioka; Koji Matsuhashi; Kokei Ito; Masayuki Ota; Hiromi Takahashi; Kazuhiro Takano
Pakistan			
Muhammad Akram; Nasir Ali; Badshah Gul; Wajid Ali; Waseem Sajjad; Muhammad Arshad; Maqsood Ali; Rahat Maqsood; Naveel Akram; Abrar Khan; Faryad Ali; Faisal Qadeer			

== Results ==
All times are Arabia Standard Time (UTC+03:00)

=== Round robin ===
Pos	Team	Pld	W	D	L	PF	PA	PD	Pts	Qualification
1	India	4	4	0	0	153	83	+70	8	Gold medal match
2	Pakistan	4	3	0	1	141	107	+34	6	Gold medal match
3	Iran	4	1	1	2	122	146	−24	3	Bronze medal match
4	Bangladesh	4	1	0	3	129	165	−36	2	Bronze medal match
5	Japan	4	0	1	3	92	136	−44	1	

Source: Official website

2 December
9:00

Pakistan	34–16 (HT: 23–6)	Japan

Aspire Hall 4, Doha

2 December
10:00

India	40–21 (HT: 24–14)	Bangladesh

Aspire Hall 4, Doha

2 December
17:00

Japan	25–44 (HT: 11–29)	India

Aspire Hall 4, Doha

2 December
18:00

Iran	25–45 (HT: 11–20)	Pakistan

Aspire Hall 4, Doha

3 December
17:00

Japan	24–24 (HT: 7–11)	Iran

Aspire Hall 4, Doha

3 December
18:00

Pakistan	42–35 (HT: 17–24)	Bangladesh

Aspire Hall 4, Doha

4 December
17:00

Bangladesh	39–56 (HT: 20–31)	Iran

Aspire Hall 4, Doha

4 December
18:00

India	31–20 (HT: 9–11)	Pakistan

Aspire Hall 4, Doha

5 December
17:00

Iran	17–38 (HT: 10–14)	India

Aspire Hall 4, Doha

5 December
18:00

Bangladesh	34–27 (HT: 10–11)	Japan

Aspire Hall 4, Doha

=== Final round ===
==== Bronze medal match ====
6 December
17:00

Iran	26–37 (HT: 9–15)	Bangladesh

Aspire Hall 4, Doha

==== Gold medal match ====
6 December
18:00

India	35–23 (HT: 21–14)	Pakistan

Aspire Hall 4, Doha

== Final standing ==
Rank	Team	Pld	W	D	L
1st place, gold medalist(s)	India	5	5	0	0
2nd place, silver medalist(s)	Pakistan	5	3	0	2
3rd place, bronze medalist(s)	Bangladesh	5	2	0	3
4	Iran	5	1	1	3
5	Japan	4	0	1	3
