= Akhlaq Hussain =

Pakistani kabaddi player

Medal record

Representing Pakistan

Men's Kabaddi

Asian Games
Bronze medal – third place	2010 Guangzhou	Team

Akhlaq Hussain (born 5 January 1992) is a Pakistani professional international Kabaddi player. He was a member of the Pakistan national kabaddi team that won the Asian Games bronze medal in 2010 in Guangzhou.
