= Jagdeep Singh (kabaddi) =

Indian kabaddi player

Medal record

Representing India

Men's Kabaddi

Asian Games
Gold medal – first place	2010 Guangzhou	Team

Jagdeep Singh born 10 August 1980 is representative for India in the sport of Kabaddi. He was a member of the kabaddi team that won a gold medal in the 2010 Asian games in Guangzhou.
