= Muhammad Ali (kabaddi) =

Pakistani kabaddi player (born 1983)

Medal record

Representing Pakistan

Men's Kabaddi

Asian Games
Bronze medal – third place	2010 Guangzhou	Team

Muhammad Ali (born 5 May 1983) is a Pakistani professional international Kabaddi player. He was a member of the Pakistan national kabaddi team that won the Asian Games bronze medal in 2010 in Guangzhou.
