= Abul Kalam (kabaddi) =

Bangladeshi kabaddi player

Medal record

Men's Kabaddi

Asian Games
Bronze medal – third place	2006 Doha	Team

Abul Kalam (Bengali: আবুল কালাম) (born 1 December 1978) is a Bangladeshi kabaddi player who was part of the team that won the bronze medal at the 2006 Asian Games.
