= Md Mizanur Rahman =

Bangladeshi kabaddi player

Medal record

Men's Kabaddi

Asian Games
Bronze medal – third place	2006 Doha	Team

Md Mizanur Rahman (Bengali: মোঃ মিজানুর রহমান; born 15 September 1978) is a Bangladeshi kabaddi player who was part of the team, that won the bronze medal at the 2006 Asian Games.
