= Kazi Yunus Ahmed =

Bangladeshi kabaddi player

Medal record

Men's Kabaddi

Asian Games
Bronze medal – third place	2006 Doha	Team

Kazi Yunus Ahmed (Bengali: কাজী ইউনুস আহমেদ) (born 2 January 1980) is a Bangladeshi kabaddi player who was part of the team that won the bronze medal at the 2006 Asian Games.
