= Japan national kabaddi team =

Japanese men's national kabaddi team

Japan
- Association: Japan Kabaddi Association
- Confederation: Asian Kabaddi Federation (AKF)
- Head Coach: Ryokei Kushige
- Captain: Tetsuro Abe

World Cup
- 3 (first in 2004)
- (bronze) 3rd (2007)

Asian Games
- 10 (first in 1990)
- (bronze) 3rd (2010)

Asian Championship
- 9 (first in 1980)
- (silver) 2nd (2002)
Medal record
Event	1st	2nd	3rd
World Cup	0	0	1
Asian Games	0	0	1
Asian Championship	0	1	0
Total	0	1	2

The Japan national kabaddi team represents Japan in international men's kabaddi competitions. It reached the semi-finals of the 2007 Kabaddi World Cup, its best result at the tournament, and won the bronze medal at the 2010 Asian Games. It is captained by Tetsuro Abe.

== History ==
Japan has played in every edition of the men's kabaddi tournament at the Asian Games since the sport was introduced in 1990, finishing fourth in 1990, 1994 and 2002 and winning its only medal, a bronze, in 2010. It hosted the 1994 Games in Hiroshima and the 2026 Games in Aichi–Nagoya.

At the 2022 Asian Games in Hangzhou, Japan lost all four of its group matches and finished ninth.

At the 2026 Asian Games, hosted at the Tokai Citizens Gymnasium in Tokai, Japan opened with a 49–24 defeat to defending champions India, then beat Bangladesh 40–37, lost 34–30 to Chinese Taipei and ended its campaign with a 62–35 win over South Korea. It finished with two wins and two defeats, level with Chinese Taipei and Bangladesh in Group A, and missed the semi-finals on head-to-head record; it was ranked seventh. Captain Tetsuro Abe said more than 80 per cent of the players had come to the sport through the manga Kabaddi.

== Tournament history ==
==== World Cup ====
Japan has played in all three editions of the Kabaddi World Cup organised by the International Kabaddi Federation. It reached the quarter-finals in 2004 and the semi-finals in 2007, where it was awarded a joint bronze medal with Bangladesh, and went out in the group stage in 2016.

Year	Rank	M	W	D	L	PF	PA	PD
(India) 2004	Quarter-finals							
(India) 2007	Third place (joint)							
(India) 2016	Group stage							
Total	3/3							

==== Asian Games ====
Japan has competed in all ten men's kabaddi tournaments at the Asian Games since the sport was introduced in 1990, hosting the 1994 and 2026 editions. Its only medal is the bronze won at the 2010 Asian Games, and it finished fourth in 1990, 1994 and 2002.

Year	Rank	M	W	D	L	PF	PA	PD
(China) 1990	4th place	5	1	0	4	84	130	-46
(Japan) 1994	4th place	4	1	0	3	90	159	-69
(Thailand) 1998	5th place	6	2	0	4	136	166	-30
(South Korea) 2002	4th place	5	2	0	3	83	107	-24
(Qatar) 2006	5th place	4	0	1	3	92	136	-44
(China) 2010	Third place	4	2	0	2	91	110	-19
(South Korea) 2014	7th place	3	0	0	3	57	120	-63
(Indonesia) 2018	7th place	5	2	0	3	121	162	-41
(China) 2022	9th place	4	0	0	4	100	191	-91
(Japan) 2026	7th place	4	2	0	2	156	155	+1
Total	10/10	44	12	1	31	1010	1436	-426

===== 2026 Asian Games results =====
Date	Round	Opponent	Score
21 September 2026	Group A	India	24–49
—	Group A	Bangladesh	40–37
23 September 2026	Group A	Chinese Taipei	30–34
24 September 2026	Group A	South Korea	62–35

==== Asian Kabaddi Championship ====
Japan has played in the Asian Kabaddi Championship since the first edition in 1980, and its best result is second place in 2002.

Year	Rank
1980	Participated
(Malaysia) 2002	Runners-up
Total	9

=== Indoor kabaddi ===
==== Asian Indoor and Martial Arts Games ====
Year	Rank	M	W	D	L	PF	PA	PD
(Macau) 2007	Group stage							
(Vietnam) 2009	Group stage							
Total	2							

== Recent results ==
Event	Dates	Venue	Result
Asian Games	21–26 September 2026	Tokai, Japan	7th place (2 wins, 2 defeats in Group A)
Asian Games	2–7 October 2023	Xiaoshan, China	9th place (4 defeats)

== Current squad ==
The following 12 players were named for the 2026 Asian Games, with Tetsuro Abe as captain.

Name	Role
Tetsuro Abe (Captain)	All-rounder
Etsuki Manita	All-rounder
Yuten Kawate	All-rounder
Hiroto Chiba	Defender (Cover or Corner)
Daiki Aratake	Defender (Cover or Corner)
Hyuma Kurashima	Defender (Cover or Corner)
Shoya Suzuki	
Katsumi Abe	
Fumitaka Sato	
Ryo Furihata	
Yudai Kaneko	
Hiroki Natsuyoshi	

=== Former players ===
The following players appeared in an earlier listing of the squad but were not named for the 2026 Asian Games.

- Masayuki Shimokawa
- Garyo Kono
- Kazuhiro Takano
- Masaki Hatakeyama

== Coaching staff ==
Position	Name
Head coach	(Japan) Ryokei Kushige

== International grounds ==
Locations of stadiums which have hosted international kabaddi matches in Japan

Stadium	City	Prefecture	Capacity	Matches hosted	Notes
Yoyogi National Gymnasium	Tokyo	Tokyo Metropolis	13,000	Asian Kabaddi Championship, invitational tournaments	One of Japan’s premier indoor arenas; occasionally used for kabaddi
Osaka Prefectural Gymnasium	Osaka	Osaka Prefecture	8,000	Friendly matches, cultural sports festivals	Used for multi-sport events and kabaddi promotion in Kansai region
Tokai Citizens Gymnasium	Tokai	Aichi Prefecture		2026 Asian Games kabaddi	Venue for all kabaddi matches at the 2026 Asian Games
