= Mosharrof Hossain =

Bangladeshi kabaddi player

Medal record

Men's Kabaddi

Asian Games
Bronze medal – third place	2006 Doha	Team

Mosharrof Hossain (Bengali: মোশাররফ হোসেন) (born 16 June 1978) is a Bangladeshi kabaddi player who was part of the team that won the bronze medal at the 2006 Asian Games.
