= Razu Ahmed =

Bangladeshi kabaddi player

Medal record

Men's Kabaddi

Asian Games
Bronze medal – third place	2006 Doha	Team B

Razu Ahmed Faisal (Bengali: রাজু আহমেদ; born 12 December 1984) is a Bangladeshi kabaddi player who was part of the team that won the bronze medal at the 2006 Asian Games.
