= Rakesh Kumar (kabaddi) =

Indian kabaddi player

Personal information
- Nicknames: King of Kabaddi, Legend in Kabaddi
- Nationality: Indian
- Born: 15 April 1983 (age 43) Delhi, India
- Height: 1.80 m (5 ft 11 in)
- Weight: 78 kg (172 lb)

Sport
- Country: India
- Sport: Kabaddi
- Position: All Rounder
- League: Pro Kabaddi League
- Club: Indian Railways; Northern Railways; Patna Pirates (2014-2016); U Mumba (2016-2017); Telugu Titans (2017)
- Team: India
Medal record
Representing India
World Cup
Gold medal – first place	2004 Mumbai	India
Gold medal – first place	2007 Panvel	India
Asian Games
Gold medal – first place	2006 Doha	India
Gold medal – first place	2010 Guangzhou	India
Gold medal – first place	2014 Incheon	India
- Updated on 22 May 2014

Rakesh Kumar (born 15 April 1983) is a former Indian professional Kabaddi player and Coach. He was the vice-captain of the Indian team that won the gold medal at the 2007 World Cup at Panvel, India. In 2011, in recognition of his achievements in the sport, he was awarded the Arjuna Award by the Government of India.

== Early life ==
Rakesh Kumar was born on 15 April 1983, in the Nizampur village of North West Delhi. He took up Kabaddi in 1997 during his school days. After having played for his school team, he represented Delhi at the national level, before making it to the senior national team in 2003.

== Career ==
Rakesh Kumar made his debut for the national team in 2003. In addition to winning medals at the national level, he was a part of the national team that won gold medals at the World Cups in 2004, 2007. With the team, he also won gold medals at the Asian Games in 2006, 2010 and 2014, South Asian Games in 2006 and 2010, and the Asian Indoor Games in 2007, 2009 and 2013.

=== Pro Kabaddi League ===
At the auction of the inaugural season of the Pro Kabaddi League, Kumar was the recipient of the highest bid, having been bought for ₹12.8 lakh (US$13,000) by the Patna franchise, the team later named Patna Pirates. He was made the captain of the team who led the team to a third-place finish in the 2014 season. He was signed by U Mumba for the 2016 season. Then for the 2017 season, he was swapped to Telugu Titans.

Currently, he is the head coach of the Haryana Steelers.
