= Maqsood Ali =

Professional kabaddi player (born 1982)

Medal record

Representing Pakistan

Men's Kabaddi

Asian Games
Silver medal – second place	2006 Doha	Team
Bronze medal – third place	2010 Guangzhou	Team

Maqsood Ali (born 4 April 1982) is a Pakistani professional international Kabaddi player. He was a member of the Pakistan national kabaddi team that won the Kabaddi silver medal at the 2006 Asian Games in Doha and bronze medal at the 2010 Asian Games in Guangzhou.
