= Badsha Miah =

Bangladeshi kabaddi player

Medal record

Men's Kabaddi

Asian Games
Bronze medal – third place	2006 Doha	Team

Badsha Miah (Bengali: বাদশা মিয়া, born 24 August 1970) is a Bangladeshi Ha-du-du player who was part of the team that won the bronze medal at the 2006 Asian Games.
