= Abrar Khan =

Pakistani kabaddi player

Medal record

Representing Pakistan

Men's Kabaddi

Asian Games
Silver medal – second place	2006 Doha	Team
Bronze medal – third place	2010 Guangzhou	Team

Abrar Khan Nehal (born 2 February 1984) is a Pakistani professional international Kabaddi player. He was a member of the Pakistan national kabaddi team that won the silver medal at the 2006 Asian Games in Doha and bronze at the 2010 Asian Games in Guangzhou.
