= Kabaddi at the 1998 Asian Games =

- Venue: Srinakharinwirot University
- Dates: 13–16 December 1998
- Nations: 7

The Kabaddi event was contested by six teams at the 1998 Asian Games in Srinakharinwirot University, Bangkok, Thailand from 13 to 16 December.

India won the gold medal in a round robin competition by winning all six matches. Pakistan, who won four matches and drew one finished second and won the silver medal. Bangladesh won the bronze medal.

== Schedule ==
●	Round	●	Last round

Event↓/Date →	13th Sun	14th Mon	15th Tue	16th Wed
Men	●	●	●	●

== Medalists ==
Event	Gold	Silver	Bronze
Men	India; C. Honappa; Sanjeev Kumar; Virender Kumar; Muruga Nantham; Biswajit Palit; B. C. Ramesh; Rambir Singh Sangwan; Kiranpal Singh; Ram Mehar Singh; Shamsher Singh	Pakistan; Zubair Ahmed; Muhammad Akram; Muhammad Ghulam; Badshah Gul; Mehmood Hussain; Iqbal Javid; Abdul Majeed; Muhammad Mansha; F. Muhammad; Muhammad Sarwar	Bangladesh

== Results ==
Pos	Team	Pld	W	D	L	PF	PA	PD	Pts
1	India	6	6	0	0	295	119	+176	12
2	Pakistan	6	4	1	1	219	80	+139	9
3	Bangladesh	6	3	2	1	169	97	+72	8
4	Sri Lanka	6	3	1	2	141	207	−66	7
5	Japan	6	2	0	4	136	166	−30	4
6	Thailand	6	1	0	5	98	258	−160	2
7	Nepal	6	0	0	6	73	204	−131	0

Source: Results

13 December

India	17–9 (HT: 10–6)	Pakistan

Srinakharinwirot University, Bangkok

13 December

Nepal	6–17 (HT: 4–12)	Sri Lanka

Srinakharinwirot University, Bangkok

13 December

Japan	8–25 (HT: 1–3)	Bangladesh

Srinakharinwirot University, Bangkok

13 December

Thailand	28–41 (HT: 8–18)	Sri Lanka

Srinakharinwirot University, Bangkok

13 December

India	36–10 (HT: 14–5)	Bangladesh

Srinakharinwirot University, Bangkok

13 December

Nepal	13–52 (HT: 4–26)	Japan

Srinakharinwirot University, Bangkok

14 December

Pakistan	16–16 (HT: 2–10)	Bangladesh

Srinakharinwirot University, Bangkok

14 December

Thailand	14–28 (HT: 12–7)	Japan

Srinakharinwirot University, Bangkok

14 December

India	57–40 (HT: 37–21)	Nepal

Srinakharinwirot University, Bangkok

14 December

Sri Lanka	31–16 (HT: 3–1)	Japan

Srinakharinwirot University, Bangkok

14 December

Pakistan	58–14 (HT: 24–3)	Nepal

Srinakharinwirot University, Bangkok

14 December

Thailand	22–50 (HT: 7–31)	India

Srinakharinwirot University, Bangkok

15 December

Bangladesh	10–0	Nepal
	Walkover

Srinakharinwirot University, Bangkok

15 December

Sri Lanka	13–76 (HT: 8–36)	India

Srinakharinwirot University, Bangkok

15 December

Pakistan	55–11 (HT: 26–6)	Thailand

Srinakharinwirot University, Bangkok

15 December

Japan	25–59 (HT: 8–34)	India

Srinakharinwirot University, Bangkok

15 December

Bangladesh	84–13 (HT: 44–6)	Thailand

Srinakharinwirot University, Bangkok

15 December

Sri Lanka	15–57 (HT: 6–24)	Pakistan

Srinakharinwirot University, Bangkok

16 December

Nepal	0–10	Thailand
	Walkover

Srinakharinwirot University, Bangkok

16 December

Japan	7–24 (HT: 6–7)	Pakistan

Srinakharinwirot University, Bangkok

16 December

Bangladesh	24–24 (HT: 5–8)	Sri Lanka

Srinakharinwirot University, Bangkok

== Final standing ==
Rank	Team	Pld	W	D	L
1st place, gold medalist(s)	India	6	6	0	0
2nd place, silver medalist(s)	Pakistan	6	4	1	1
3rd place, bronze medalist(s)	Bangladesh	6	3	2	1
4	Sri Lanka	6	3	1	2
5	Japan	6	2	0	4
6	Thailand	6	1	0	5
7	Nepal	6	0	0	6
