= Wajid Ali (kabaddi) =

Pakistani kabaddi player (born 1984)

Medal record

Representing Pakistan

Men's Kabaddi

Asian Games
Silver medal – second place	2006 Doha	Team
Bronze medal – third place	2010 Guangzhou	Team
Bronze medal – third place	2014 Incheon	Team

Wajid Ali (born 11 January 1984) is a Pakistani professional international Kabaddi player. He was a member of the Pakistan national kabaddi team that won the silver medal at the 2006 Asian Games in Doha, and bronze medals at the 2010 Asian Games in Guangzhou and the 2014 Asian Games in Incheon.
