= Nasir Ali (kabaddi) =

Pakistani kabaddi player (born 1982)

Medal record

Representing Pakistan

Men's Kabaddi

Asian Games
Silver medal – second place	2006 Doha	Team
Bronze medal – third place	2010 Guangzhou	Team
Bronze medal – third place	2014 Incheon	Team
Bronze medal – third place	2018 Jakarta	Team

Nasir Ali (born 1 January 1982) is a Pakistani professional international Kabaddi player. He was a member of the Pakistan national kabaddi team that won the silver medal at the 2006 Asian Games in Doha, and Asian Games bronze medals in 2010 in Guangzhou and in 2014 in Incheon.
