= Kabaddi at the 1994 Asian Games =

- Venue: Shudo University Ground
- Dates: 12–14 October 1994
- Nations: 5

Kabaddi was contested by five teams at the 1994 Asian Games in Hiroshima, Japan from October 12 to October 14.

India won the gold by a 4-0 record, For India the crunch match was against Pakistan, their first match against Pakistan was abandoned in controversial circumstances when the scores were tied 19-all with more than a minute left for the final whistle. A replay was ordered by the technical committee.

== Schedule ==
●	Round	●	Last round

Event↓/Date →	12th Wed	13th Thu	14th Fri
Men	●	●	●

== Medalists ==
Event	Gold	Silver	Bronze
Men	India; Kasinatha Baskaran; Perumal Ganesan; Raju Ghule; A. K. Munivenkatappa; Biswajit Palit; Tirath Raj; S. Rajarathinam; Ashok Shinde; Avtar Singh; Surender Singh	Bangladesh	Pakistan; Zubair Ahmed; Muhammad Akram; Tahir Afzal Gujjar; Mehmood Hussain; Muhammad Zahoor Joya; Wasim Khan; Hassan Raza Khawaja; Muhammad Mansha; Sultan Mehmood; Muhammad Sarwar

== Results ==
All times are Japan Standard Time (UTC+09:00)

Pos	Team	Pld	W	D	L	PF	PA	PD	Pts
1	India	4	4	0	0	227	78	+149	8
2	Bangladesh	4	3	0	1	100	91	+9	6
3	Pakistan	4	2	0	2	153	90	+63	4
4	Japan	4	1	0	3	90	159	−69	2
5	Nepal	4	0	0	4	78	230	−152	0

Source: Results

12 October
10:00

India	62–16	Japan

Shudo University Ground, Hiroshima

12 October
11:00

Bangladesh	44–14	Nepal

Shudo University Ground, Hiroshima

12 October
14:00

India	Suspended	Pakistan

Shudo University Ground, Hiroshima

12 October
15:00

Japan	19–25	Bangladesh

Shudo University Ground, Hiroshima

13 October
10:00

Nepal	9–65	Pakistan

Shudo University Ground, Hiroshima

13 October
11:00

India	39–10	Bangladesh

Shudo University Ground, Hiroshima

13 October
14:00

Bangladesh	21–19	Pakistan

Shudo University Ground, Hiroshima

13 October
15:00

Japan	37–23	Nepal

Shudo University Ground, Hiroshima

14 October
10:00

India	42–20	Pakistan

Shudo University Ground, Hiroshima

14 October
11:00

Japan	18–49	Pakistan

Shudo University Ground, Hiroshima

14 October
14:00

India	84–32	Nepal

Shudo University Ground, Hiroshima

== Final standing ==
Rank	Team	Pld	W	D	L
1st place, gold medalist(s)	India	4	4	0	0
2nd place, silver medalist(s)	Bangladesh	4	3	0	1
3rd place, bronze medalist(s)	Pakistan	4	2	0	2
4	Japan	4	1	0	3
5	Nepal	4	0	0	4
