= Navneet Gautam =

Indian kabaddi player

Medal record

Representing India

Men's Kabaddi

Asian Games
Gold medal – first place	2010 Guangzhou	Team

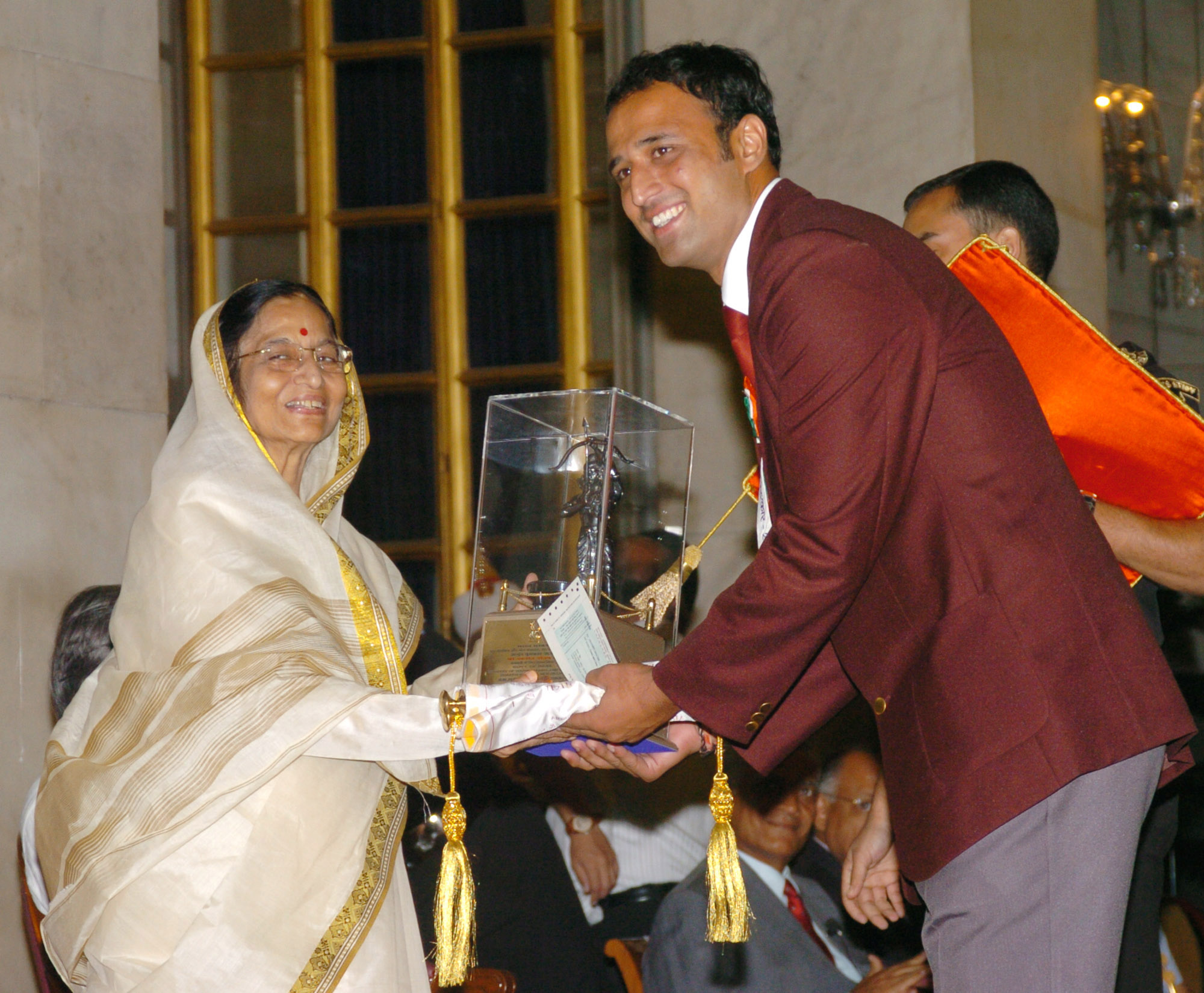
President Pratibha Patil presenting the 2006 Arjuna Award to Navneet Gautum in 2007

Navneet Gautam is an Indian professional Kabaddi player. He was a member of the kabaddi team that won a gold medal in the 2010 Asian games in Guangzhou.
