= Bangladesh national kabaddi team =

Bangladeshi men's national kabaddi team

Bangladesh
- Nickname(s): Tigers of the Court
- Association: Bangladesh Kabaddi Federation
- Confederation: Asian Kabaddi Federation (AKF)
- Head Coach: Md Abdul Jalil
- Captain: Mizanur Rahman
- Most caps: Md Abdul Jalil

World Cup
- 3 (first in 2004)
- (bronze) 3rd (2004, 2007)

Asian Games
- 10 (first in 1990)
- (silver) 2nd (1990, 1994, 2002)

Asian Championship
- 6 (first in 1980)
- (silver) 2nd (1980, 1988)
Medal record
Event	1st	2nd	3rd
World Cup	0	0	2
Asian Games	0	3	2
Asian Championship	0	2	0
Asian Indoor Games	0	0	2
Asian Beach Games	0	0	1
Commonwealth Championship	0	0	1
South Asian Games	0	3	7
Bangabandhu Cup	4	0	0
Total	4	8	15
World Cup
Bronze medal – third place	2004 India	
Bronze medal – third place	2007 India	
Asian Games
Silver medal – second place	1990 Beijing	
Silver medal – second place	1994 Hiroshima	
Silver medal – second place	2002 Busan	
Bronze medal – third place	1998 Bangkok	
Bronze medal – third place	2006 Doha	
Asian Championship
Silver medal – second place	1980 India	
Silver medal – second place	1988 India	
Asian Indoor Games
Bronze medal – third place	2007 Macau	
Bronze medal – third place	2009 Hanoi	
Asian Beach Games
Bronze medal – third place	2008 Bali	
Commonwealth Championship
Bronze medal – third place	2026 Ahmedabad	
South Asian Games
Silver medal – second place	1985 Dhaka	
Silver medal – second place	1987 Kolkata	
Silver medal – second place	1995 Madras	
Bronze medal – third place	1989 Islamabad	
Bronze medal – third place	1993 Dhaka	
Bronze medal – third place	2004 Islamabad	
Bronze medal – third place	2006 Colombo	
Bronze medal – third place	2010 Dhaka	
Bronze medal – third place	2016 Guwahati	
Bronze medal – third place	2019 Kathmandu	
Bangabandhu Cup
Gold medal – first place	2021 Bangladesh	
Gold medal – first place	2022 Bangladesh	
Gold medal – first place	2023 Bangladesh	
Gold medal – first place	2024 Bangladesh	

Bangladesh national kabaddi team represents Bangladesh in international men's kabaddi competitions. It won the bronze medal at the 2006 Asian Games and the bronze medal at the inaugural 2026 Commonwealth Kabaddi Championship. In 1980, Bangladesh became the runners-up in the first Asian Kabaddi Championship and India emerged as the champion. Bangladesh became runners-up again in the next Asian Kabaddi Championship held in 1988 at Jaipur, India. Kabaddi is the national sport of Bangladesh.

== Recent history ==
At the 2026 Asian Games in Aichi–Nagoya, Bangladesh, captained by Mizanur Rahman and coached by Md Abdul Jalil, won its first two matches, beating South Korea 39–35 and Chinese Taipei 48–47, then lost 40–37 to Japan and 48–25 to India. It finished fourth in Group A with two wins and two defeats and missed the semi-finals on head-to-head record, which went in Chinese Taipei's favour, and was ranked fifth.

In April 2026 the men's team played in the beach kabaddi event at the 2026 Asian Beach Games in Sanya, the first Asian Beach Games since 2016. In Group A it beat Syria 54–23 and lost to Iran (31–47) and Pakistan, finishing third in the group and missing the knockout rounds.

At the inaugural 2026 Commonwealth Kabaddi Championship in Ahmedabad in October 2026, Bangladesh finished second in Group B, winning four of its five matches and losing 32–31 to Kenya. It lost the semi-final 56–27 to India and took the bronze medal.

== Tournament history ==
=== Standard kabaddi ===
==== World Cup ====
World Cup
Year	Rank	M	W	D	L	PF	PA	PD
(India) 2004	(bronze) 3rd	5	3	0	2	192	158	+34
(India) 2007	(bronze) 3rd	5	3	0	2	185	166	+19
(India) 2016	Group stage	5	3	0	2	210	188	+22
Total	3/3	15	9	0	6	587	512	+75

==== Asian Games ====
Asian Games
Year	Rank	M	W	D	L	PF	PA	PD
(China) 1990	(silver) 2nd	6	4	1	1	135	139	-4
(Japan) 1994	(silver) 2nd	4	3	0	1	100	91	+9
(Thailand) 1998	(bronze) 3rd	6	3	2	1	169	97	+72
(South Korea) 2002	(silver) 2nd	5	3	0	2	174	91	+83
(Qatar) 2006	(bronze) 3rd	5	2	0	3	166	191	-25
(China) 2010	5th	3	1	0	2	76	89	-13
(South Korea) 2014	7th	3	0	0	3	62	91	-29
(Indonesia) 2018	5th	4	2	0	2	102	135	-33
(China) 2022	5th	4	2	0	2	133	132	+1
(Japan) 2026	5th	4	2	0	2	149	170	-21
Total	10/10	44	22	3	19	1266	1226	+40

===== 2026 Asian Games results =====
Date	Round	Opponent	Score
21 September 2026	Group A	South Korea	39–35
21 September 2026	Group A	Chinese Taipei	48–47
22 September 2026	Group A	Japan	37–40
23 September 2026	Group A	India	25–48

==== Asian Kabaddi Championship ====
Asian Kabaddi Championship
Year	Host country	Position
1980	India	(silver) 2nd
1988	India	(silver) 2nd
2000	Sri Lanka	Group Stage
2001	Thailand	Group Stage
2002	Malaysia	Group Stage
2003	Malaysia	Group Stage
2005	Iran	Didn’t Participate
2017	Iran	Didn’t Participate
2023	South Korea	Didn’t Participate

==== Commonwealth Kabaddi Championship ====
Commonwealth Kabaddi Championship
Year	Host city	Position
2026	Ahmedabad, India	(bronze) 3rd

===== 2026 Commonwealth Championship results =====
Round	Opponent	Score
Group B	Kenya	31–32
Semi-final	India	27–56

==== South Asian Games ====
South Asian Games
Year	Rank	M	W	D	L	PF	PA	PD
(Bangladesh) 1985	2nd	3	2	0	1	67	78	–11
(India) 1987	2nd	4	3	0	1	85	92	–7
(Pakistan) 1989	3rd	3	1	0	2	61	78	–17
(Bangladesh) 1993	3rd	4	2	0	2	74	86	–12
(India) 1995	2nd	4	3	0	1	88	82	+6
(Nepal) 1999	Didn’t Participate							
(Pakistan) 2004	3rd	4	2	0	2	79	91	–12
(Sri Lanka) 2006	3rd	4	2	0	2	84	89	–5
(Bangladesh) 2010	3rd	4	2	0	2	92	97	–5
(India) 2016	3rd	5	3	0	2	103	111	–8
(Nepal) 2019	3rd	5	3	0	2	96	106	–10
Total	10/11	40	23	0	17	829	910	–81

=== Beach kabaddi ===
==== Asian Beach Games ====
Asian Beach Games
Year	Rank	M	W	D	L	PF	PA	PD
(Indonesia) 2008	(bronze) 3rd	4	2	0	2	89	76	+13
(Oman) 2010	Didn’t Participate							
(China) 2012	Didn’t Participate							
(Thailand) 2014	Group stage	3	1	0	2	64	72	–8
(Vietnam) 2016	Didn’t Participate							
(China) 2026	Group stage (3rd in Group A)	3	1	0	2	115	113	+2
Total	3/6	10	4	0	6	268	261	+7

=== Indoor Kabaddi ===
==== Asian Indoor and Martial Arts Games ====
Asian Indoor and Martial Arts Games
Year	Rank	M	W	D	L	PF	PA	PD
(Macau) 2007	(bronze) 3rd	4	2	0	2	102	89	+13
(Vietnam) 2009	(bronze) 3rd	4	2	0	2	97	90	+7
(South Korea) 2013	Didn’t Participate							
(Turkmenistan) 2017	Not Held							
Total	2/3	8	4	0	4	199	179	+20

=== International Kabaddi tournament ===
==== Bangabandhu Kabaddi Cup ====
Bangabandhu Cup
Year	Rank	M	W	D	L	PF	PA	PD
(Bangladesh) 2021	Champions	5	5	0	0	220	90	+130
(Bangladesh) 2022	Champions	5	5	0	0	210	85	+125
(Bangladesh) 2023	Champions	6	6	0	0	250	100	+150
(Bangladesh) 2024	Champions	6	6	0	0	260	110	+150
Total	4/4	22	22	0	0	940	385	+555

== Recent results ==
Event	Dates	Venue	Result
Commonwealth Kabaddi Championship	23–31 October 2026	Ahmedabad, India	Third place (lost semi-final to India 56–27)
Asian Games	21–26 September 2026	Aichi–Nagoya, Japan	Fifth place (2 wins, 2 defeats in Group A)
Asian Beach Games	22–30 April 2026	Sanya, China	Group stage (3rd in Group A)

== Current squad ==
The following 12 players were named for the 2026 Asian Games; Mizanur Rahman was the captain.

Name	Role
Mizanur Rahman (Captain)	Raider
Monirul Chowdhury	Raider
Sabuj Mia	Right-cover (Defender)
Roman Hossain	Raider
Nasir Uddin Sharif	All-rounder
Al Amin	Raider
Dipayon Golder	Left-cover (Defender)
Rasel Hasan	Right-corner (Defender)
Nesar Howlader	Raider
Julfiker Akash	
Hasibul Hossain	
Razu Sheikh	All-rounder

=== Former players ===
The following players appeared in an earlier listing of the squad but were not named for the 2026 Asian Games.

- Md Liton Ali
- Md Fardous Sheikh
- Razib Ahmed
- Amol Chanddar Roy
- Md Assaduzzaman
- Md Sazidul Chaklader

== Coaching staff ==
Position	Name
Head coach	(Bangladesh) Md Abdul Jalil
Team leader	(Bangladesh) Md Anwar Hossain

== International grounds ==
Locations of stadiums which have hosted international kabaddi matches in Bangladesh

Stadium	City	Division	Capacity	Matches hosted	Notes
Bangladesh Kabaddi Stadium	Dhaka	Dhaka Division			
Shaheed Suhrawardy Indoor Stadium	Dhaka	Dhaka Division	3,000	Asian Games qualifiers, Bangabandhu Cup	Main indoor venue for Bangladesh national kabaddi team; hosted multiple international events
Shaheed Tajuddin Ahmed Indoor Stadium	Dhaka	Dhaka Division	2,500	Bangabandhu Cup Kabaddi	Alternate indoor venue for international and national kabaddi events
MA Aziz Stadium	Chattogram	Chattogram Division	30,000	Exhibition matches, national finals	Occasionally used for outdoor kabaddi matches and national sports festivals

== List of National Awardee in Bangladesh ==
1. Abdul Jalil-2001
2. Badshah Mia-2002
3. Ziaur Rahaman-2005
4. Amir Hossiin Patwari-2007
5. Jahangir Alom-2009

== Bangladesh Kabaddi Federation ==
Bangladesh Amateur Kabadi Federation was formed in 1973. It framed rules and regulations for the game. For more information visit Bangladesh Kabaddi Federation. Kabaddi is the national sport of Bangladesh
