= Bozlur Rashid =

Bangladeshi kabaddi player

Medal record

Men's Kabaddi

Asian Games
| Bronze medal – third place | 2006 Doha | Team |

Md Bozlur Rashid (Bengali: বজলুর রশিদ) (born 1 December 1977) is a Bangladeshi kabaddi player who was part of the team that won the bronze medal at the 2006 Asian Games.
