= Ziaur Rahman (kabaddi) =

Bangladeshi kabaddi player

Medal record

Men's Kabaddi

Asian Games
Bronze medal – third place	2006 Doha	Team

Ziaur Rahman Ziaur (Bengali: জিয়াউর রহমান; born 1 October 1981) is a Bangladeshi kabaddi player who was on the team that won the bronze medal at the 2006 Asian Games. He also played in PKL for Puneri Paltan.
