= Abu Salah Musa =

Bangladeshi kabaddi player

Medal record

Men's Kabaddi

Asian Games
Bronze medal – third place	2006 Doha	Team

Abu Salah Musa (Bengali: আবু সালেহ মুসা; born 1 February 1981) is a Bangladeshi kabaddi player who was part of the team that won the bronze medal at the 2006 Asian Games.
