= Kabaddi at the 2010 Asian Games – Women's tournament =

Women at the 2010 Asian Games
- Venue: Nansha Gymnasium
- Date: 22–26 November 2010
- Competitors: 90 from 8 nations

Medalists
gold medal	India
silver medal	Thailand
bronze medal	Bangladesh
bronze medal	Iran

Women's kabaddi at the 2010 Asian Games was held in Nansha Gymnasium, Guangzhou, China from 22 to 26 November 2010.

Eight teams entered the competition but The Nepalese women's team was unable to participate due to a dispute between the National Sports Council and the Nepal Olympic Committee regarding players' participation.

== Squads ==
Bangladesh	Chinese Taipei	India	Iran
Shahnaz Parvin Maleka; Maleka Parvin; Farzana Akhter Baby; Juni Chakma; Kazi Shahin Ara; Rupali Akhter; Sharmin Sultana Rima; Dolly Shefali; Fatema Akhter Poly; Kochi Rani Mondal; Hena Akhter; Ismat Ara Nishi	Sung Wan-jung; Lin Shu-ching; Kang Mei-wen; Lai Yi-hsiu; Wang Jen-yi; Lin Hsin-yeh; Shih Chia-ling; Shih Pin-ju; Huang Miao-hsiang; Chen Pei-tzu	Snehal Sampat Salunkhe; Kavitha Selvaraj; V. Tejeswini Bai; Sanahanbi Devi; Pooja Sharma; Kavita; Manisha; Deepika Henry Joseph; Shermi Ulahannan; Mamatha Poojary; Kalyani Marella; Smita Kumari	Soheila Solbi; Fatemeh Momeni; Saeideh Maghsoudloo; Maliheh Miri; Shilan Sharezouli; Ghazal Khalaj; Farideh Zarifdoust; Zahra Masoumabadi; Samira Shabani; Salimeh Abdollahbakhsh; Marzieh Eshghi; Sedigheh Jafari
Malaysia	Nepal	South Korea	Thailand
Thibahtarusini Arumugam; Balajothi Gunasekaran; Saraswathy Krishnan; Punitta Subramaniam; Ellammal Ravichandran; Sobana Sathasivam; Ruth Brigttee Kremlin; Norhaslinda Misrawi; Turgaini Rajagopal; Seetha Devy Ravindran	Sarswati Thapa; Ambika Kumari Mandal; Asha Kumari Chaudhary; Netar Kumari Thapa; Shanti Kumari Malla; Kosh Maya Basnet; Ramita Kumari Thapa; Nitu Gurung; Minu Gurung; Sanjana Tamang; Nirmala Bisti; Sangita Gautam	Jang Hyeon-ju; An Hyeon-jeong; Lee Hyun-jeong; Kim Min-ju; Yeo Hye-jin; Jo Hyun-a; Ryu Eun-bin; Im Ji-yun; Seo Eun-hye; Im Su-jeong	Alisa Limsamran; Namfon Kangkeeree; Chonlada Chaiprapan; Kamontip Suwanchana; Treeveeraporn Tongnun; Janjira Panprasert; Atchara Puangngern; Nuchanart Maiwan; Sutarat Thonghun; Yaowaret Nitsara; Wattakan Kammachot; Naleerat Ketsaro

== Results ==
All times are China Standard Time (UTC+08:00)

=== Preliminary round ===
==== Group A ====
Pos	Team	Pld	W	D	L	PF	PA	PD	Pts	Qualification
1	Thailand	3	3	0	0	130	86	+44	6	Semifinals
2	Iran	3	2	0	1	173	69	+104	4	Semifinals
3	Chinese Taipei	3	1	0	2	95	139	−44	2	
4	Malaysia	3	0	0	3	62	166	−104	0	

Source: Results

22 November
9:00

Thailand	45–19 (HT: 33–9)	Malaysia

Nansha Gymnasium, Guangzhou

22 November
10:00

Iran	62–18 (HT: 29–7)	Chinese Taipei

Nansha Gymnasium, Guangzhou

23 November
15:50

Malaysia	33–48 (HT: 14–30)	Chinese Taipei

Nansha Gymnasium, Guangzhou

23 November
16:40

Iran	38–41 (HT: 16–22)	Thailand

Nansha Gymnasium, Guangzhou

24 November
9:00

Iran	73–10 (HT: 35–5)	Malaysia

Nansha Gymnasium, Guangzhou

24 November
9:50

Thailand	44–29 (HT: 27–4)	Chinese Taipei

Nansha Gymnasium, Guangzhou

==== Group B ====
Pos	Team	Pld	W	D	L	PF	PA	PD	Pts	Qualification
1	India	3	3	0	0	81	41	+40	6	Semifinals
2	Bangladesh	3	2	0	1	48	53	−5	4	Semifinals
3	South Korea	3	1	0	2	40	75	−35	2	
4	Nepal	3	0	0	3	0	0	0	0	

Source: Results

22 November
10:40

India	34–20 (HT: 22–7)	Bangladesh

Nansha Gymnasium, Guangzhou

22 November
11:30

Nepal	0–0	South Korea
	Walkover

Nansha Gymnasium, Guangzhou

23 November
16:40

India	0–0	Nepal
	Walkover

Nansha Gymnasium, Guangzhou

23 November
17:30

South Korea	19–28 (HT: 10–16)	Bangladesh

Nansha Gymnasium, Guangzhou

24 November
10:40

Nepal	0–0	Bangladesh
	Walkover

Nansha Gymnasium, Guangzhou

24 November
11:30

India	47–21 (HT: 20–11)	South Korea

Nansha Gymnasium, Guangzhou

=== Knockout round ===
Semifinals
25 November
Thailand	34
Bangladesh	23
25 November
India (5R)	23
Iran	22

Final
26 November
Thailand	14
India	28

==== Semifinals ====
25 November
15:00

Thailand	34–23 (HT: 25–14)	Bangladesh

Nansha Gymnasium, Guangzhou

25 November
15:50

India	17–17 (HT: 8–11) 6–5	Iran

Nansha Gymnasium, Guangzhou

==== Final ====
26 November
15:00

Thailand	14–28 (HT: 7–17)	India

Nansha Gymnasium, Guangzhou

== Final standing ==
Rank	Team	Pld	W	D	L
1st place, gold medalist(s)	India	5	5	0	0
2nd place, silver medalist(s)	Thailand	5	4	0	1
3rd place, bronze medalist(s)	Bangladesh	4	2	0	2
3rd place, bronze medalist(s)	Iran	4	2	0	2
5	Chinese Taipei	3	1	0	2
5	South Korea	3	1	0	2
7	Malaysia	3	0	0	3
7	Nepal	3	0	0	3
