= List of Bangladeshi people =

Listed below are notable people who are either citizens of Bangladesh, born in the region of what is now Bangladesh, or of Bangladeshi origin living abroad. For brevity, people who fall into more than one category are listed in only one of them. For further information, see Bangladeshi people.

== Leaders of independence movements ==
=== British colonial period ===
Bipin Chandra Pal,one of the architects of Swadeshi movement

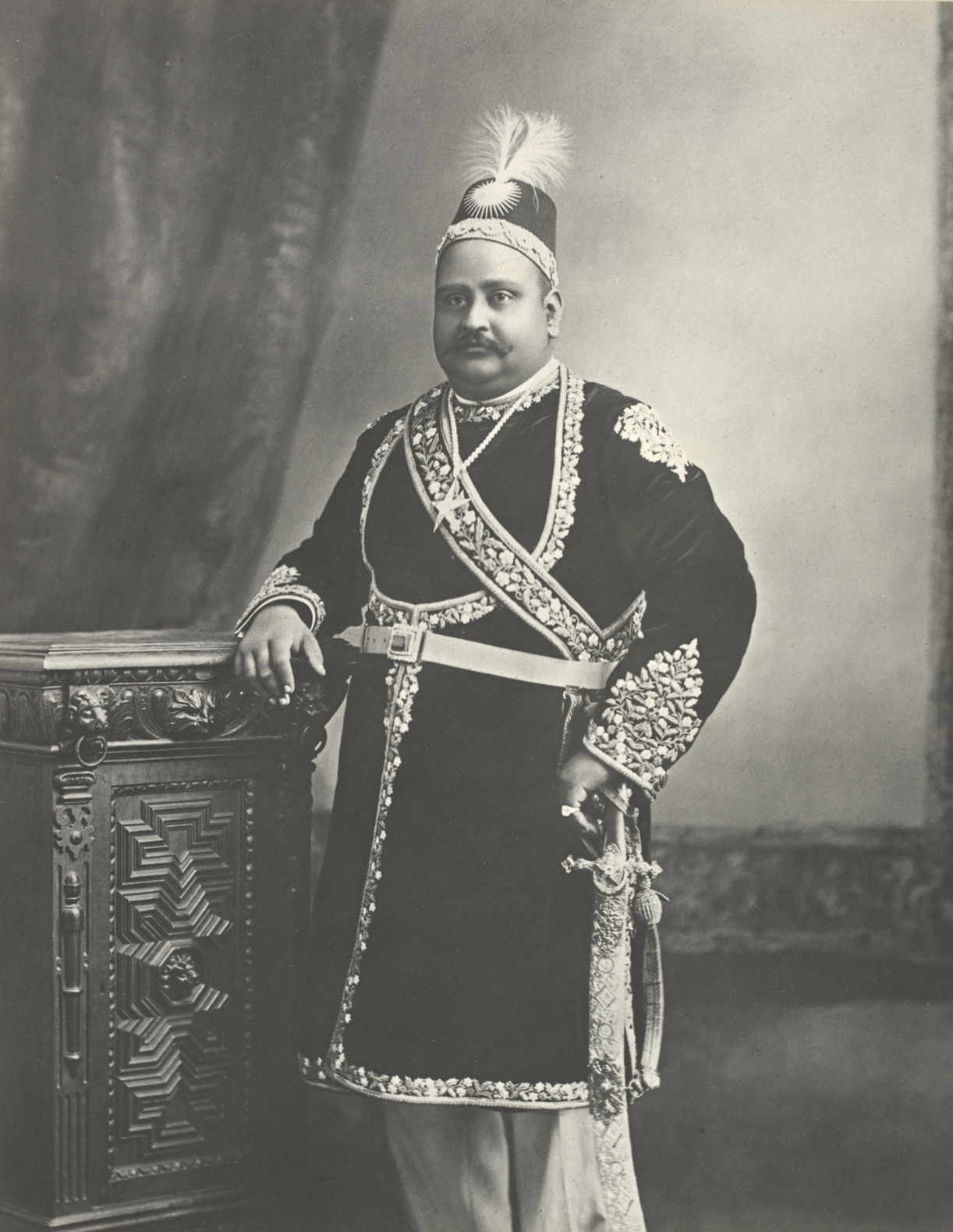
Khwaja Salimullah,nawab of Dhaka and one of the founder of Muslim League

- Bipin Chandra Pal, one of the main architects of the Swadeshi movement.He also opposed the partition of Bengal by the British colonial government.
- Trailokyanath Chakravarty, Indian Independence activist, spent 30 years in Cellular Jail, later East Pakistani politician.
- Pulin Behari Das, revolutionary and the founder-president of the Dhaka Anushilan Samiti.
- Kalpana Datta, revolutionary
- Ashwini Kumar Dutta, independence activist. organized Swadesh Bandhab Samiti to boycott British goods.
- Bhupendra Kumar Datta, born in Jessore, Jugantar. leader and revolutionary.
- Ganesh Ghosh, born in Chittagong, Indian independence activist, revolutionary, and politician
- Badal Gupta, born in Bikrampur, Dhaka, revolutionary and anti-colonial figure
- Benoy Basu, born in Bikrampur, Dhaka, revolutionary and anti-colonial figure
- Khwaja Salimullah, founder of the All-India Muslim League
- Haji Shariatullah, founder of the Faraizi Movement
- Jatindra Mohan Sengupta, born in Chittagong, lawyer and President of the Bengal Provincial Congress Committee.
- Nawaab Syed Shamsul Huda, first Indian Muslim president of the reformed legislative council
- A. K. Fazlul Huq, Prime Minister of Bengal (1937–1943), Chief Minister of East Bengal (1954–1955) and Governor of East Pakistan (1956)
- Nawab Abdul Latif, educator and social worker
- Ananta Singh, revolutionary who participated in the Chittagong armoury raid in 1930.
- Huseyn Shaheed Suhrawardy, last Prime Minister of Bengal (1946–1947), later Prime Minister of Pakistan (1956–1957)
- Haji Mohammad Danesh Bangladeshi politician and communist revolutionary
- Abdul Hamid Khan Bhashani, one of the founders of the Awami League.
- Surya Sen, revolutionary and leader of Indian independence movement
- Pritilata Waddedar, activist of the Indian independence movement
- titumir Revolutionary
- kaji Nazrul Islam, writer

=== Martyrs of the Bengali Language Movement, 1952 ===
- Rafiq Uddin Ahmed
- Abul Barkat
- Abdul Jabbar
- Abdus Salam
- Shafiur Rahman

=== Bangladesh War of Independence, 1971 ===
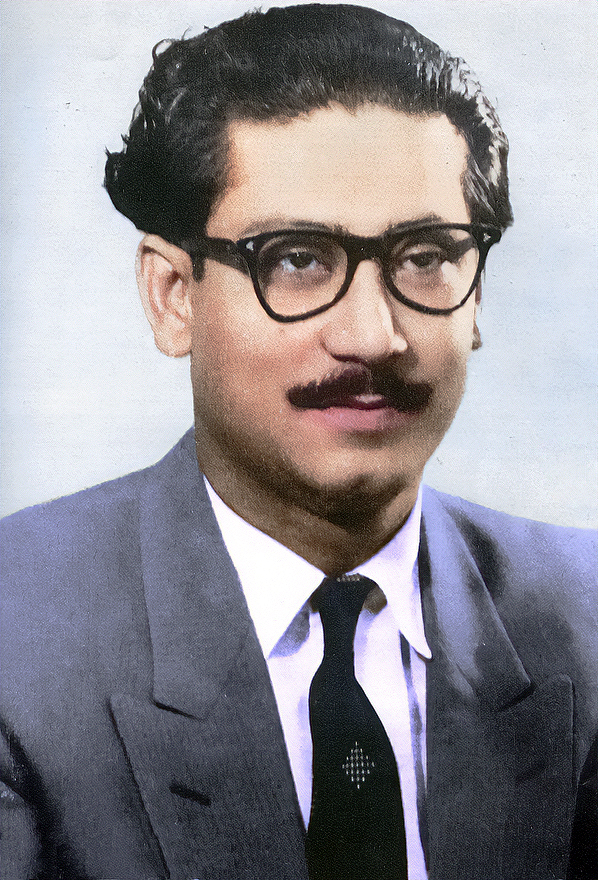
Sheikh Mujibur Rahman

- Sheikh Mujibur Rahman, leader of Awami League and chief character of Bangladesh Liberation War.
- Maulana Abdul Hamid Khan Bhashani, founder of Bangladesh Awami League, National Awami Party
- Chitta Ranjan Dutta, Sector Commander 4
- Major Nazmul Huq, Commander Sector 7 (till August 1971)
- Jagat Joity Das (Bir Bikrom), founder of Das Party, martyred freedom fighter
- Ashalata Baidya, freedom fighter and the only female commander of an all-women guerrilla group during the Bangladesh Liberation War
- Squadron Leader M. Hamidullah Khan, Bangladesh Government Chief Representative - Chakulia (Bihar) Guerilla Trng. Camp, BDF Sub-sector commander - Mankarchar (Sector 11), BDF Commander - Sector 11 (November 2–February 14, 1972)
- Major M.A. Manzur, Commander Sector 8
- Bipul Bhattacharya, freedom fighter, vocalist of Swadhin Bangla Betar Kendra during Bangladesh liberation war
- Major Khaled Musharraf, BDF Commander Sector 2, Commander K-Force
- Colonel-in-Chief Muhammad Ataul Ghani Osmany, Commander-in-Chief, Bangladesh Forces, War of Independence, 1971. (Later promoted to General)
- Major Ziaur Rahman, Declarer (on behalf of Sheikh Mujib) of the Independence of Bangladesh on March 27, 1971. BDF Sector Commander Sector 1(April~May) and Central Sector - Sector 11 (June – October 10, 1971) and Z-Force Commander
- Major K.M Shafiullah, S Force commander
- Major Abu Taher, sub-sector commander - Mahendraganj (HQ 11), Interim Commander Sector 11 (October 10–November 2, 1971)

=== July Revolution, 2024 ===
- Nahid Islam
- Asif Mahmud
- Hasnat Abdullah
- Sarjis Alam

== Scientists, engineers and educators ==
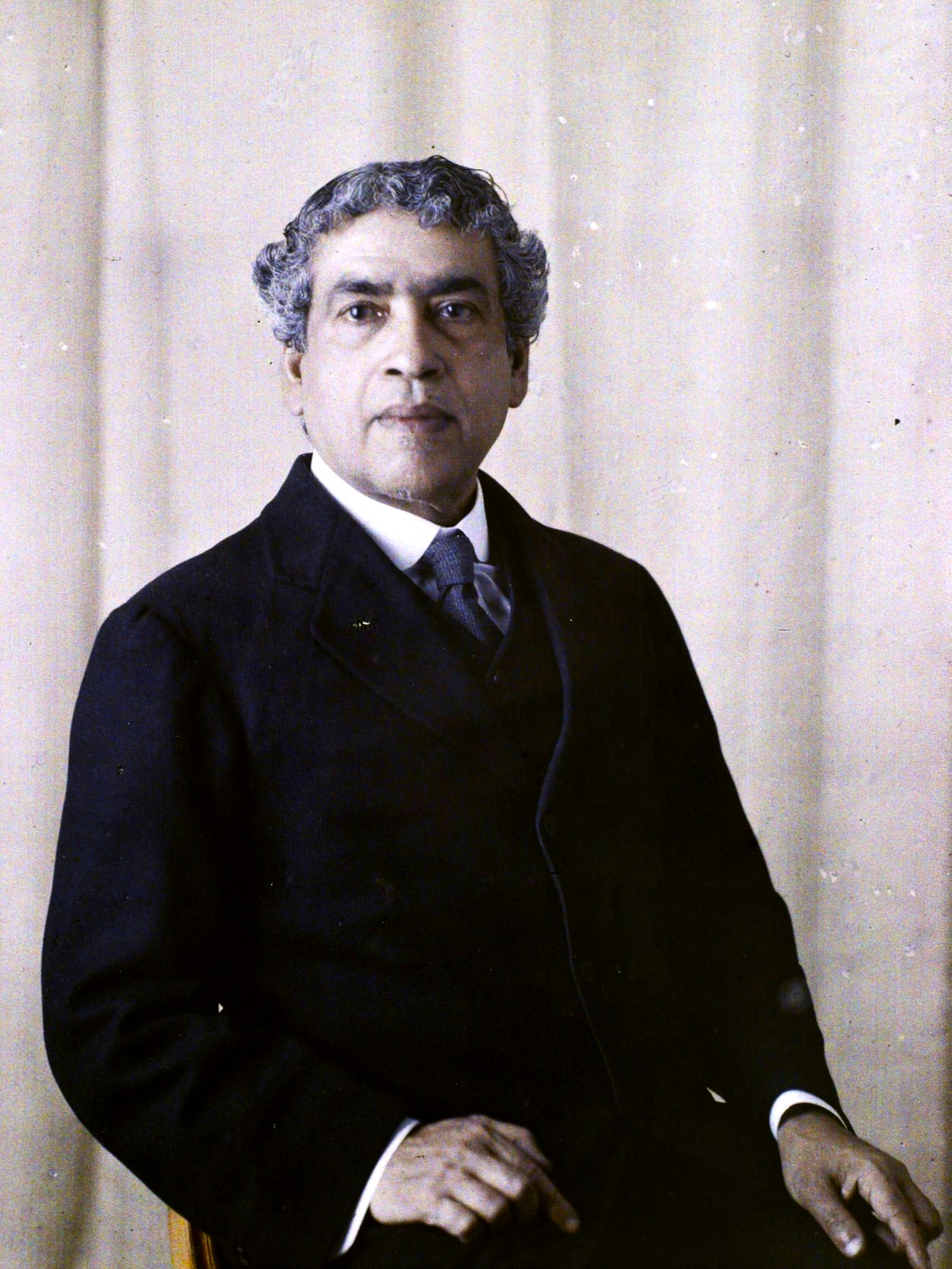
Jagadish Chandra Bose

- Nasima Akhter (born 1970), nuclear medicine researcher
- Abdullah Al Muti, scientist and science writer
- Maqsudul Alam, scientist and professor at University of Hawaiʻi
- Mir Masoom Ali, emeritus professor of statistics
- Arun Kumar Basak, scientist and professor emeritus of University of Rajshahi
- Anudvaipayan Bhattacharya, a lecturer of the Department of Applied Physics at the University of Dhaka, martyred in 1971.
- Abdus Suttar Khan invented more than forty different alloys for commercial application in space shuttles, jet engines, train engines and industrial gas turbines
- Jagadish Chandra Bose, a polymath, physicist, biologist, and botanist
- Amit Chakma, tenth president of the University of Western Ontario
- Govinda Chandra Dev, educator
- Pran Gopal Datta, physician, university administrator
- Abdus Suttar Khan
  Harinath Dey, biochemist, research scientist and academic
- SM Faruque, microbiologist and scientist, researcher on Vibrio cholerae, which causes Cholera
- Debjani Ghosh, a Bangladeshi-born researcher of the University of Ulm.
- Jyotirmoy Guhathakurta, educator and humanist.
- Pranab Kumar Chowdhury, pediatrician, academic
- Hiranmay Sen Gupta, professor of nuclear physics.
- Azizul Haque, mathematician known for his formula for the Henry Classification System of fingerprinting
- Tanzima Hashem, academic, Elsevier Foundation Award winner in 2017
- M. Zahid Hasan, professor of quantum physics at Princeton University and scientist at Lawrence Berkeley National Laboratory
- Khandkar Manwar Hossain, statistician and founder of the Department of Statistics in Rajshahi University
- Saleemul Huq, Burtoni Award winner for contributing to climate change adaptation
- Fazle Hussain, professor of mechanical engineering at Texas Tech University; elected Fellow of National Academy of Engineering
- Abul Hussam, 2007 Grainger Challenge Prize winner for Sustainability
- Muhammed Zafar Iqbal, scientist and science writer
- Jamal Nazrul Islam, physicist and mathematician
- Jawed Karim, co-creator of YouTube and designer of PayPal's anti-fraud system
- Mohammad Ataul Karim, Bangladeshi American scientist
- Fazlur Rahman Khan, structural engineer and architect
- Sezan Mahmud, Medical Scientist and Educator, writer, Dean for EID, QU Netter School of Medicine.
- Ripon Nath, sound designer and recordist.
- Shuvo Roy, Bangladeshi-American biomedical engineer known for his work on the invention of an artificial kidney. professor at University of California, San Francisco.
- Prafulla Chandra Ray, chemist, educationist, historian, industrialist and philanthropist from Bengal.
- Bibhuti Roy, engineer and educationist
- Rakhal Chandra Das, physician
- Salman Khan, founder of Khan Academy
- Senjuti Saha, scientist, Deputy Executive Director at the Child Health Research Foundation (CHRF). founder and leader of Building Scientists for Bangladesh
- Samir Kumar Saha, microbiologist and public health worker.
- Sukharanjan Samaddar, a university professor, educationalist, and martyred freedom fighter of the Bangladesh Liberation War.
- Dwijen Sharma, a naturalist and science writer.
- M. A. Naser, pioneer in engineering education in Bangladesh
- Muhammad Qudrat-i-Khuda, scientist, educationist and writer
- Khondkar Siddique-e-Rabbani, biomedical physicist
- Abdul Matin Patwari, electrical engineer, mathematician, vice-chancellor of Bangladesh University of Engineering Technology
- Qazi Motahar Hossain, scientist, statistician, founder-director of Institute of Statistical Research and Training, University of Dhaka
- Omar Ishrak, investor, entrepreneur, executive chairman and chairman of the board, Medtronic; board chairman of INTEL
- Mohammad Kaykobad, computer scientist, educator, author and columnist, professor of computer science and engineering at BUET
- Lucina Uddin, American neuroscientist, born in Bangladesh

== Educationists ==
- Anisuzzaman,national professor of Bangladesh
  Arun Kumar Basak, professor of physics in University of Rajshahi.
- K. Maudood Elahi, Bangladeshi professor and the pro-vice chancellor at multiple universities and acting vice chancellor at Stamford University.
- Serajul Islam Choudhury, educationist, public intellectual
- Kaberi Gayen, academic, author, and social activist known for her views on the oppression of minorities and gender inequality in Bangladesh.
- Rasheda K Chowdhury, Bangladeshi academic, former Advisor of Caretaker Government, Bangladesh
- Santosh Chandra Bhattacharya, senior lecturer of the department of history at the University of Dhaka martyred on 14 December 1971.
- Pran Gopal Datta, distinguished physician and medical educator. He served as the Vice-Chancellor of Bangabandhu Sheikh Mujib Medical University (BSMMU).
- Abul Kashem Fazlul Haq, educationist, former professor of University of Dhaka
- Ajoy Roy, professor of physics at the University of Dhaka, best known for his human rights activism
- Syed Manzoorul Islam, educationist, former professor of University of Dhaka
- Rafiqul Islam, national professor, Bangladesh
- Jamilur Reza Choudhury, former professor, BUET, national professor, Bangladesh
- Anisuzzaman, professor, University of Dhaka, national professor, Bangladesh

== Arts, culture, and literature ==
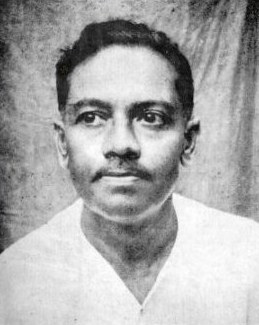
Jibanananda Das

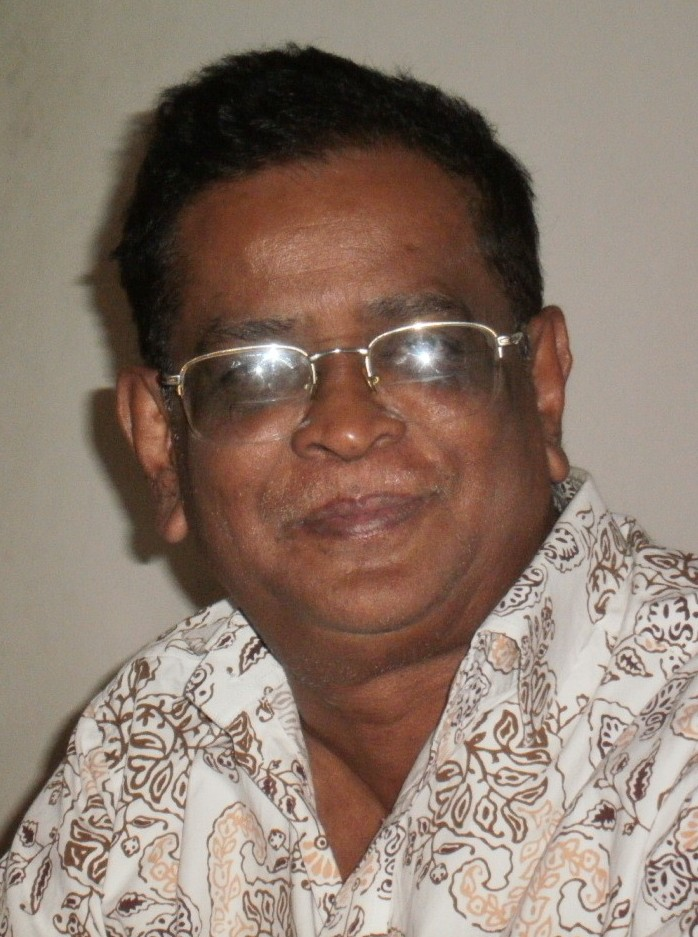
Humayun Ahmed

- Hiralal Sen, founder of Indian cinema
- Dom Antonio, born in Bhushana in the Jessore-Faridpur, first writer of Bangla prose.
- Ahmed Sofa, writer, thinker, novelist
- Zainul Abedin, painter
- Humayun Ahmed, novelist and former professor of Chemistry, Dhaka University
- Tofail Ahmed, author and researcher of folk art
- Alaol, medieval poet
- Chandravati (poet), medieval Bengali poet, widely considered to be the first known female poet of Bengali language.
- Monica Ali, author of Brick Lane
- Syed Mujtaba Ali, Bengali author, academician, scholar and linguist
- Tahmima Anam, novelist and winner of the 2008 Commonwealth Writers' Prize
- Rashid Askari, writer, fictionist, columnist, and academic
- Humayun Azad, writer and former professor of Bengali, Dhaka University
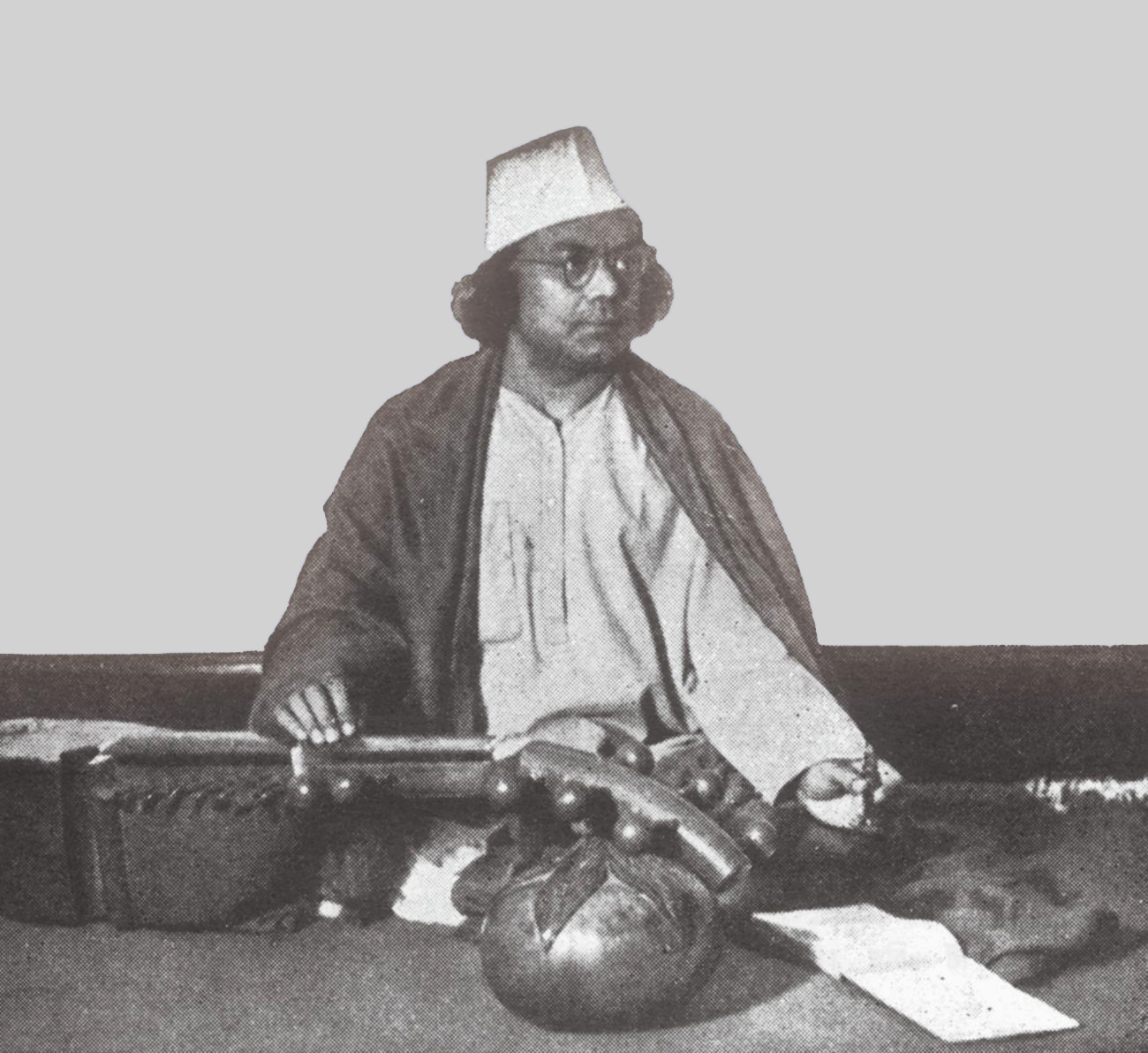
- Kazi Nazrul Islam,national poet of Bangladesh
  Rafiq Azad, poet
- Manzoor Alam Beg, photographer and author
- Shishir Bhattacharjee, artist, political cartoonist, painter
- Rituraj Bhowmick, writer
- Munier Chowdhury, educator, dramatist and intellectual killed in 1971 Liberation War of Bangladesh
- Samarjit Roy Chowdhury, painter
- Jibanananda Das, poet, writer, and educationist, major figure of twentieth-century Bengali modernist poetry.
- Michael Madhusudan Dutt, poet and playwright
- Akhteruzzaman Elias, novelist and short story writer
- Dhruba Esh, cover artist and writer, 2022 Bangla Academy Literary Award winner for his contribution to children's literature.
- Vijay Gupta (poet), medieval poet from Barisal.
- Nirmalendu Goon, poet
- Abdul Hakim, medieval poet
- Marjana Chowdhury, Bangladeshi-American model, philanthropist and beauty queen Miss Bangladesh USA
- Sikdar Aminul Haq, poet
- Quamrul Hassan, artist
- Saad Z Hossain, writer
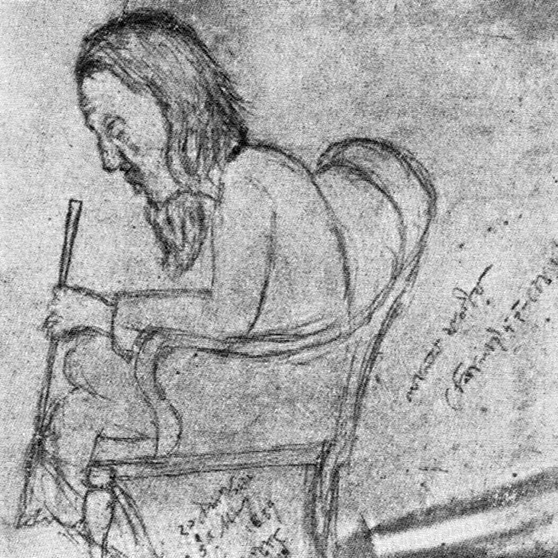
- Lalon
  Khondakar Ashraf Hossain, poet, essayist, translator and editor
- Abul Hussain, poet
- Mukunda Das, poet
- Jahanara Imam, writer and activist
- Muhammed Zafar Iqbal, writer and educator
- Kalidas Karmakar, painter
- Kazi Nazrul Islam, national poet of Bangladesh
- Mazharul Islam, architect, political activist
- Syed Jahangir, freelance artist of Bangladesh
- Adiba Jaigirdar, Bangladeshi-Irish writer
- Jasimuddin, poet
- Shahriyar Kabir, author and journalist
- Shahidullah Kaiser, educator, novelist and intellectual killed in 1971 Liberation War of Bangladesh
- Kalidas Karmakar, artist specialized in viscosity printing.
- Abul Kashem, architect and educationist
- Nitun Kundu, artist, sculptor.
- Lalon Shah, mystic poet
- Al Mahmud, poet
- Sezan Mahmud, Writer, lyricist, filmmaker, medical scientist and educationist.
- Firoz Mahmud, contemporary visual artist, creator, painter
- Muhammad Muqim, 18th century Bengali poet
- Ghulam Murshid, author, scholar and journalist
- Adwaita Mallabarman, born in Brahmanbaria, Bengali writer and journalist.
- Barin Mazumder, classical musician
- Partha Pratim Majumder, Bangladeshi mime artist who is considered the "forerunner" of mime art in Bangladesh
- Ramendu Majumdar, actor, stage director and theater producer, former president of the International Theatre Institute
- Natyaguru Nurul Momen, cultural personality, advocated for theatrical and performing arts and secular literature
- Shahabuddin Nagari, poet, writer and singer
- Shamsur Rahman, poet
- Hason Raja, mystic poet
- Begum Rokeya, writer
- Bibi Russell, model and fashion designer
- Arunabh Sarkar, poet
- Muhammad Shahidullah, Bengali educationist, writer and linguist
- Ajit Roy, Rabindra Sangeet singer
- Rudra Muhammad Shahidullah, poet
- Mahadev Saha, poet
- Ahmed Sharif, writer of Bengali literature, secularist
- SM Sultan, painter
- Kamal Chowdhury, poet
- Taslima Nasrin, writer and feminist, awardee of Ananda Puraskar
- Salimullah Khan, writer, thinker
- Hasan Azizul Haq, writer
- Sanjida Khatun, musicologist, one of the founders of Chhayanaut
- Shahid Mahmud Jangi, writer, lyricist
- Monica Jahan Bose, artist and climate activist

== Social reformers and leaders ==
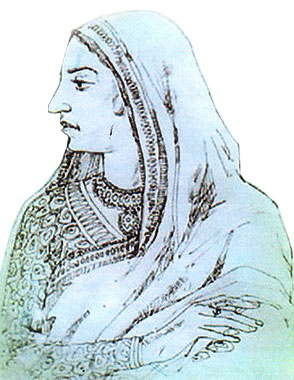
- Nawab Faizunnesa
  Ahmed Sharif,one of the most outspoken atheists and radical thinkers of Bangladesh
- Begum Rokeya, activist
- Harichand Thakur, social reformer
- Guruchand Thakur, social reformer for Dalit communities
- Jogendra Nath Mandal, Dalit social reformer and politician
- Nawab Faizunnesa education reformer
- Sir Salimullah founder dhaka University
- Fazle Hasan Abed, founder of BRAC
- Muhammad Yunus, founder of the Grameen Bank, 2006 Nobel Peace Prize winner

== Music, film and television ==
- Jaya Ahsan
  James (musician), Singer-songwriter, producer, actor
- Animesh Aich, film director
- Ayub Bachchu, singer and guitarist
- Aruna Biswas, actress
- Moutushi Biswas, actress,TV host and model.
- Chayanika Chowdhury, television drama director and filmmaker
- Shayan Chowdhury Arnob, singer-songwriter, musician, painter, filmmaker, animator and producer
- Tapan Chowdhury, singer
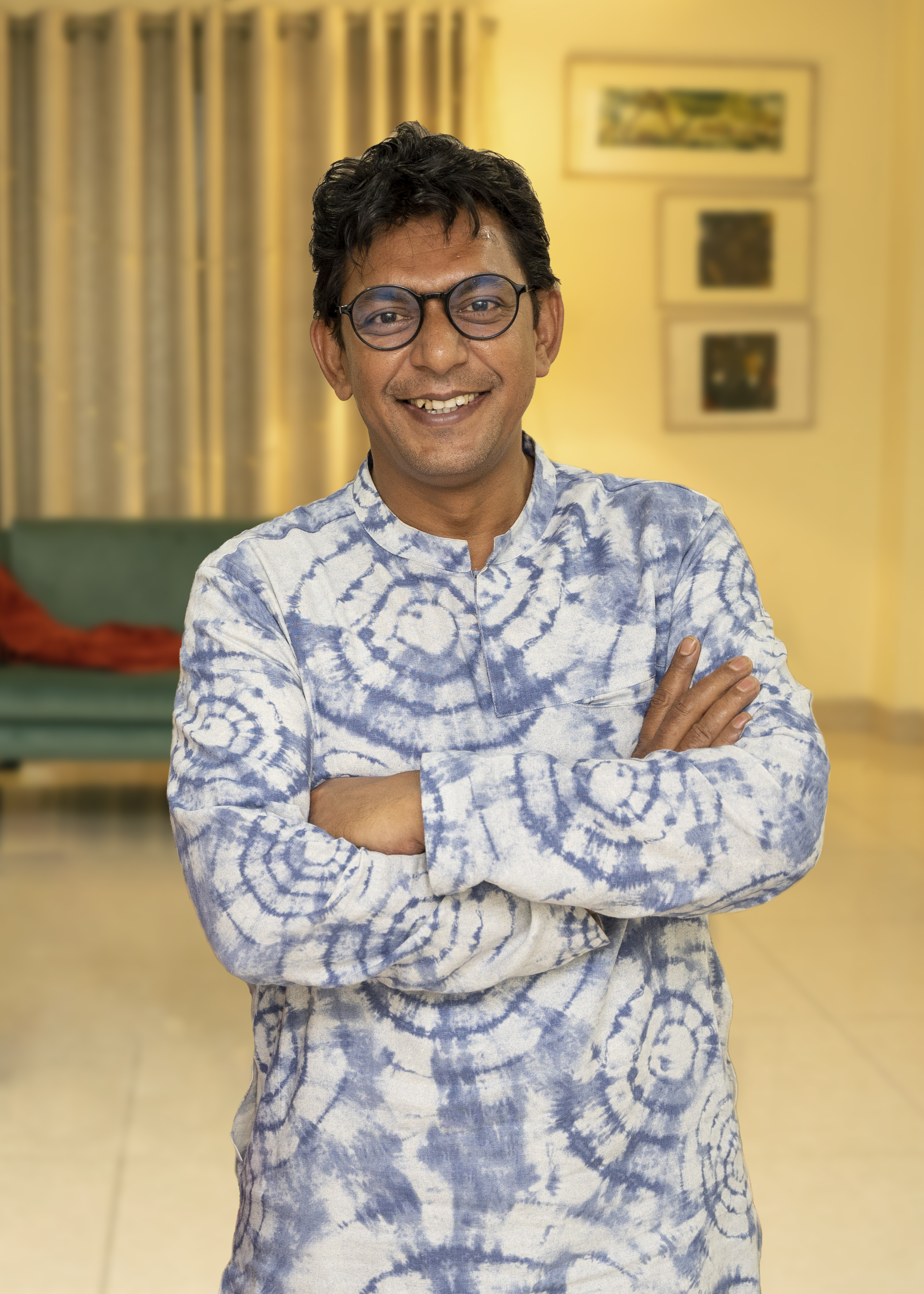
- Chanchal Chowdhury
  Brindaban Das, playwright, actor and writer
- Dipankar Dipon, film director
- Subhash Dutta, filmmaker, theater and film actor
- Anju Ghosh, actress
- Aparna Ghosh, actress
- Abdur Razzak, actor, director
- Shabana, film actress
- Bobita, film actress
- Puja Cherry, film actress
- Bappy Chowdhury, actor
- Shefali Chowdhury, actress
- Jayanta Chattopadhyay, actor and recitor
- Haimanti Rakshit Das, playback singer
- Sumita Devi, film and television actress
- Abdul "Duke" Fakir, American singer of Ethiopian and Bangladeshi descent, member of the Four Tops
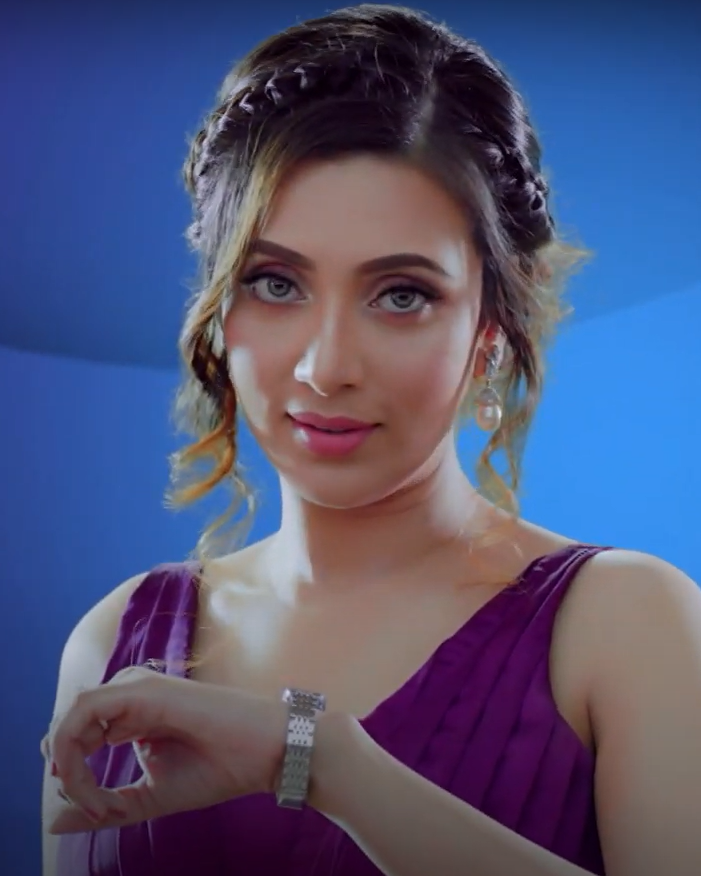
- Bidya Sinha Saha Mim
  Humayun Faridi, TV, stage, and film actor
- Chanchal Chowdhury, actor
- Bidya Sinha Saha Mim, actor and model
- Apu Biswas, film actress and model
- Jaya Ahsan, actress and producer
- Dipjol, film actor, film producer and politician
- Waheedul Haq, Tagore song specialist and journalist
- Zahid Hasan, actor and director
- Rahsaan Islam, American actor of Bangladeshi descent
- Jayasree Kabir, actress
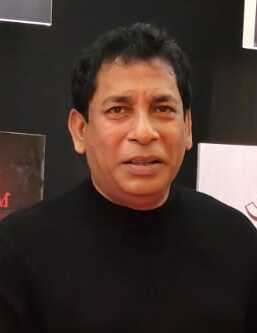
- Mosharraf Karim
  Tamalika Karmakar, stage, film, and television actress
- Bappa Mazumder, singer and lyricist
- Kaushik Hossain Taposh, music composer, singer, producer & MD of Gaan Bangla
- Mehazabien Chowdhury, actress
- Mosharraf Karim, actor
- Montazur Rahman Akbar, film director, producer
- Mukul Chowdhury, lyricist and musical artist
- Azam Khan, singer
- Alam Khan, music director and composer
- Tahsan Rahman Khan, singer and actor
- Shakib Khan, actor, producer, singer, film organiser and media personality
- Arifin Shuvoo, actor, television presenter, RJ and model
- Nusraat Faria
  Runa Laila, singer
- Manna, film actor
- Tareque Masud, film director
- Tanvir Mokammel, film director
- Mitali Mukherjee, classical and playback singer, won National Award in 1982.
- Ramendu Majumdar, actor, stage director and theater producer.
- Subir Nandi, musician. winner of Bangladesh National Film Award for Best Male Playback singer.
- Asaduzzaman Noor, actor, politician and member of parliament
- Khan Ataur Rahman, film director
- Priyanka Gope, National Film award winning classical and playback vocalist
- Rathindranath Roy, musician
- Shahnaz Rahmatullah, singer
- Raja Chanda, film director
- Raef al Hasan Rafa, Musician, singer-songwriter, producer
- Shayan Chowdhury Arnob, Musician, record producer, artist
- Saidus Salehin Khaled Sumon, Singer-songwriter, bass player, record producer, actor, entrepreneur
- Rola,model
- Shabnam, film actress
- Dino Shafeek, British actor, known for Mind Your Language
- Salman Shah, film actor
- Satya Saha, composer and musician
- Shithi Saha, playback singer
- Sabina Yasmin, singer
- Urmila Srabonti Kar, TV actress
- Zahir Raihan, film director
- Sharmin Sultana Sumi, singer
- Emon Chowdhury, singer

== Economists ==
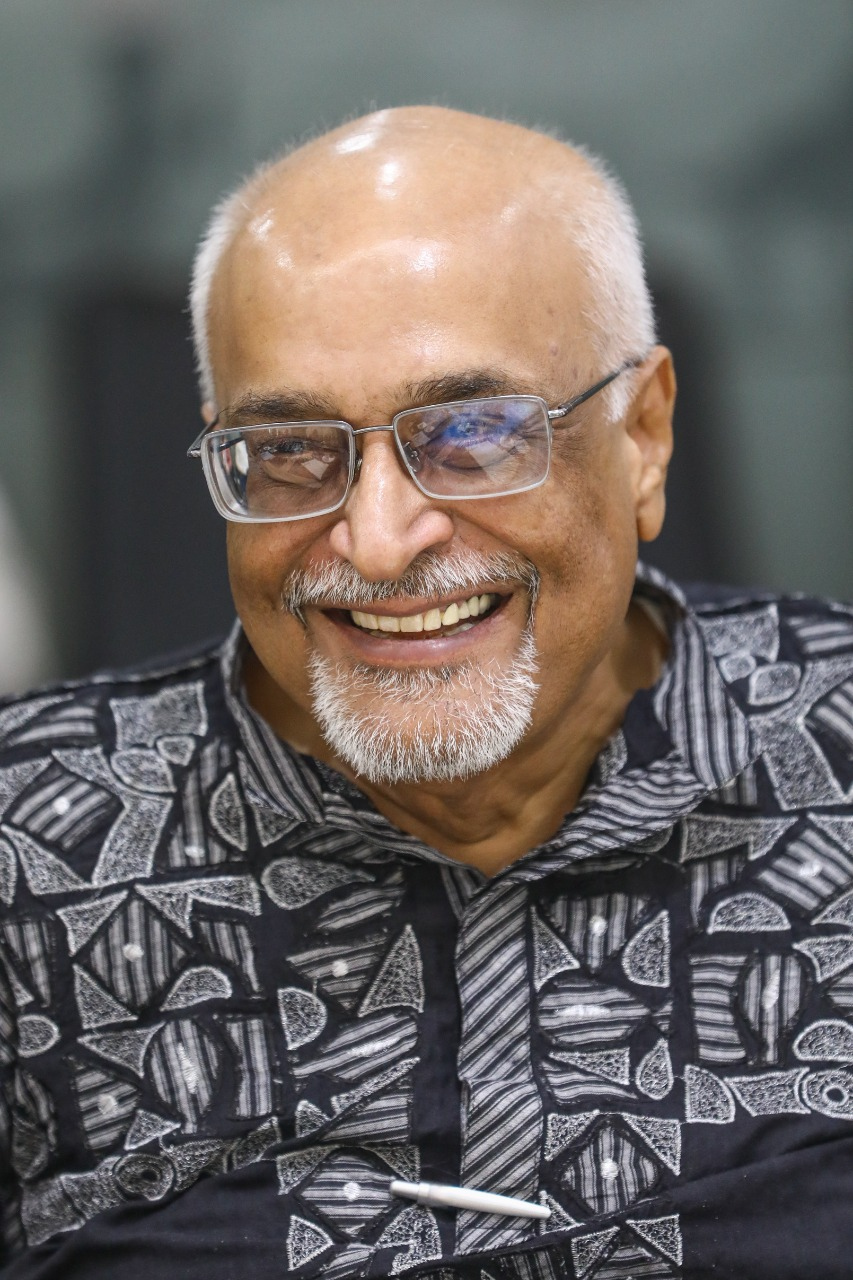
- Debapriya Bhattacharya
  Debapriya Bhattacharya, economist and public policy analyst, executive director of Centre for Policy Dialogue in Dhaka, senior research fellow at Bangladesh Institute of Development Studies (BIDS)
- Muhiuddin Khan Alamgir,economist and polician, elected member of IMF (International Monetary Fund)
- Qazi Kholiquzzaman Ahmad, economist and development thinker, Chairman of Dhaka School of Economics
- Akbar Ali Khan, economist
- Swadesh Bose, economist. posthumously given the Independence Day Award, Bangladesh's highest state award.
- Fakhruddin Ahmed, chief adviser of Bangladesh from 2007 to 2009 and served as governor of Bangladesh Bank.
- Nurul Islam, economist, Deputy Chairman of the Planning Commission, author
- Naila Kabeer, Indian-born British Bangladeshi social economist.
- Anu Muhammad, economist
- Atiur Rahman, development economist, author and banker.
- Md. Anisur Rahman, economist, former member of the Planning Commission, author
- Muzaffar Ahmed, economist and emeritus professor at the Institute of Business Administration of the University of Dhaka
- Sanat Kumar Saha, economist
- Atiur Rahman, economist, Governor of Bangladesh Bank and former director of the state-owned Sonali Bank
- Rehman Sobhan, economist
- Abul Barkat, economist

== Entrepreneurs ==
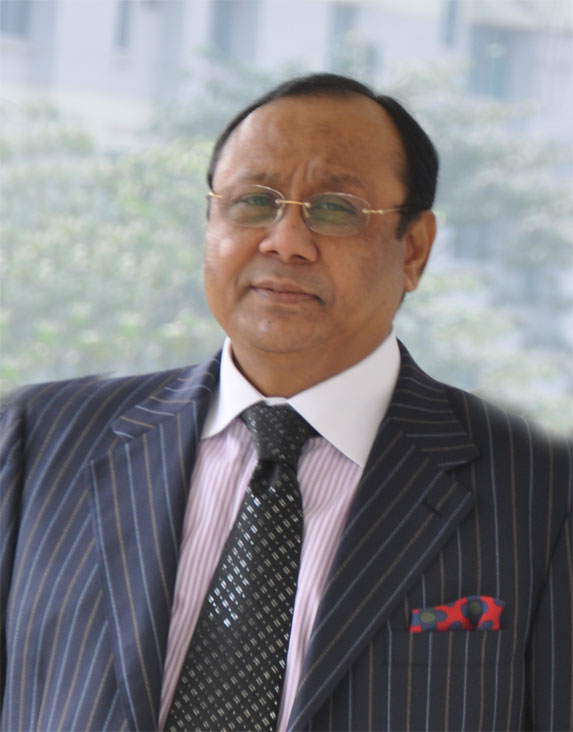
Ahmed Akbar Sobhan

- Mahmudul Hasan Sohag Founder of Rokomari.com and Udvash
- Abdul Awal Mintoo, former president of Federation of Bangladesh Chambers of Commerce and Industry (FBCCI)
- Amjad Khan Chowdhury, founder of Bangladesh business conglomerate PRAN-RFL Group
- Subir Chowdhury, Bangladeshi-American entrepreneur and philanthropist
- Ahmed Akbar Sobhan, chairman of the business conglomerate Bashundhara Group
- Ananta Jalil, chairman of AJ Group (Bangladesh)
- Ayman Sadiq, founder of 10 Minute School
- Chittaranjan Saha,visionary entrepreneur who revolutionized the publishing sector in Bangladesh.
- Numeri Sattar Apar, founder of Apar’s Classroom and ACS
- Hemi Hossain, entrepreneur, founder and CEO of NeXgen Global Group
- Sir Fazle Hasan Abed, founder and chairperson of the world's largest international development Non-Governmental Organization, BRAC
- Nitun Kundu, Bangladeshi artist, sculptor and entrepreneur.He founded the furniture company Otobi.
- Ranada Prasad Saha, a businessman, soldier, and humanitarian
- Sal Khan, Half Bangladeshi and founder of Khan Academy
- Samson H. Chowdhury, chairman of Astras Ltd. and Square (Bangladesh)
- Syed Manzur Elahi, founder of Apex Group
- Iqbal Quadir, co-founder of GrameenPhone
- Mahmudur Rahman, newspaper owner and editor
- Mohammad Fazlul Azim, chairman of Azim Group, former MP
- Omar Ishrak, investor, entrepreneur, executive chairman and chairman of the board, Medtronic; board chairman of INTEL.

== Media and journalism ==
- Nirmal Kumar Sengupta, journalist
- Mukhlesur Rahman Chowdhury, former adviser to the President of Bangladesh
- Salah Choudhury, writer, peace activist and journalist
- Lenin Gani, journalist, winner of the Best Sports Report in 2001 by Dhaka Reporters Unity
- Kaberi Gayen, prominent academic, author, columnist for The Daily Star
- Gautam Das, print journalist and bureau chief of Dainik Samakal
- Mainul Hosein, former chairman of the editorial board of The Daily Ittefaq
- Naveed Mahbub, comedian and columnist
- Santosh Gupta, journalist
- Subhash Singha Roy, journalist, columnist
- Aydha Mehnaz, modest fashion innovator featured in Forbes' 30 Under 30, the first Bangladeshi featured.
- Ajoy Dasgupta, journalist.
- Matiur Rahman, editor of the daily Prothom Alo, winner of Ramon Magsaysay Award for journalism
- Manik Chandra Saha, journalist, recipient of Ekushey Padak
- Ranesh Maitra, journalist, columnist
- Shykh Seraj, director of News Channel i, Agriculture Development activist, winner of FAO A.H. Boerma Award, Ekushey Padak
- Swadesh Roy, journalist, writer and political analyst
- Shyamal Dutta, journalist and editor of Bhorer Kagoj
- Mahbub Jamal Zahedi, former editor of the Khaleej Times, assistant editor of Dawn, and founder-editor of The Agatya
- Munni Saha, journalist, television presenter
- Samia Zaman, Editor and CEO of the television channel Ekattor TV
- Tasmima Hossain, on 4 July 2018, she was made the editor of The Daily Ittefaq
- Anisul Hoque, associate editor of a Bengali-language daily Prothom Alo, editor of monthly youth magazine Kishor Alo
- Naem Nizam, Editor Bangladesh Pratidin
- Farida Yasmin, President of Jatiya Press Club
- Khaled Muhiuddin, head of the German-based international media, Deutsche Welle Bangla Department

== Political figures ==
- Manoranjan Dhar, former law minister, BD
- Anwara Khatun, member of East Pakistan Legislative Assembly
- Muhiuddin Khan Alamgir, adviser, Bangladesh Awami League, former Home Minister
- M Saifur Rahman, former finance minister
- Shah M S Kibria, former finance minister
- Abdus Samad Azad, former Foreign Minister
- Dewan Farid Gazi, former minister
- Abul Mal Abdul Muhit, incumbent finance minister
- Nurul Islam Nahid, incumbent education minister
- Nipun Roy Chowdhury, Bangladesh Nationalist Party politician, lawyer, activist
- Jahangir Kabir Nanak, One of the Presidium Member of Bangladesh Awami League, Former Minister of Textiles and Jute.
- Abul Mansur Ahmed, politician from Mymensingh
- Moudud Ahmed, barrister, politician and statesman
- Oli Ahmed (Bir Bikrom), Politician, known for roles as President of the Liberal Democratic Party (Bangladesh), and founding member of the Bangladesh Nationalist Party (BNP)
- Shahabuddin Ahmed, former president
- Majid-ul-Haq, minister
- Ghulam Azam, Islamist politician, former leader of Jamaat-e-Islami Bangladesh, accused of war crimes for his role in 1971 Bangladesh Liberation War
- Muhammad Ali Bogra, Prime Minister of Pakistan, 1953–1955
- Fazlul Qadir Chaudhry, Politician, acting president of Pakistan, Speaker of the National Assembly of Pakistan, President of Muslim League, accused of war crimes for his role in 1971 Bangladesh Liberation War
- Hamidul Huq Choudhury, Foreign Minister of Pakistan, 1954–1956
- A.B.M. Mohiuddin Chowdhury, mayor of Chittagong, member of the Chowdhury Family
- A.Q.M. Badruddoza Chowdhury, former president, Leader of Bikalpa Dhara
- Motiya Chowdhury, member of Parliament, former Minister of Agriculture
- Saber Hossain Chowdhury, member of Parliament
- Ramesh Chandra Sen, former Member of Parliament
- Salauddin Quader Chowdhury, former Minister, accused of war crimes for his role in 1971 Bangladesh Liberation War, son of Fazlul Qadir Chaudhry
- Mirza Ghulam Hafiz, politician and minister
- Khorshed Ara Haque, Member of Parliament
- Altaf Husain, Minister of Commerce and Industry of Pakistan, 1965–1968
- Abdul Jolil, politician and Minister
- Comrade Moni Singh, founding general secretary of Bangladesh Communist Party
- Jahanara Khan, politician and parliament member
- Morshed Khan, former Foreign Minister
- Khawaja Nazimuddin, second Governor-General of Pakistan, and the second prime minister of Pakistan
- Shah Azizur Rahman, former prime minister of Bangladesh
- Md. Hafizur Rahman, Politician, former Minister of Food and Agriculture, Commerce, and Finance and Planning in Pakistan
- Tareq Rahman, senior vice president of Bangladesh Nationalist Party (BNP), son of Begum Khaleda Zia and Ziaur Rahman
- Abdur Razzaq, former minister of agriculture
- Nawab Sir Khwaja Salimullah, first to propose the creation of the All India Muslim League
- M. A. Sattar, politician, MP (Narayanganj-4)
- Suranjit Sengupta, politician and minister
- Sadhan Chandra Majumder, Minister of Food, BD
- Swapan Bhattacharjee, Minister of State for Local Government, Rural Development and Co-operatives
- Dhirendra Debnath Shambhu, MP (Barguna-1)
- Pankaj Nath, MP (Barisal-4)
- Jaya Sengupta, MP (Sunamganj)
- Biren Sikder, MP (Magura-2)
- Manoranjan Shill Gopal, MP (Dinajpur-1)
- Siddiqul Alam Siddiq, politician and parliament member
- Amal Sen - president of Workers Party of Bangladesh

== Photographers ==
- GMB Akash
- Shahidul Alam
- Anwar Hossain
- Sarker Protick
- Munem Wasif

== Heads of state or government ==
- Khondaker Mostaq Ahmad, President, August 15, 1975 – November 3, 1975
- Tajuddin Ahmed, (by Appointment and Oath) Prime Minister, 1971–1972
- Hussain Mohammed Ershad, by (India supported Military Coup) Chief Martial Law Administrator (CMLA) 1982–1985 and self declared President (1985–1990 December 6)
- Sheikh Hasina, (elected) Prime Minister, 1996–2001, 2009–13, 2013–2024
- Begum Khaleda Zia, (elected) Prime Minister; 1991–1996, 1996–1996, 2001–2006
- Muhammad Yunus, Chief Adviser of Interim government, 2024-2026.

== Intellectuals ==
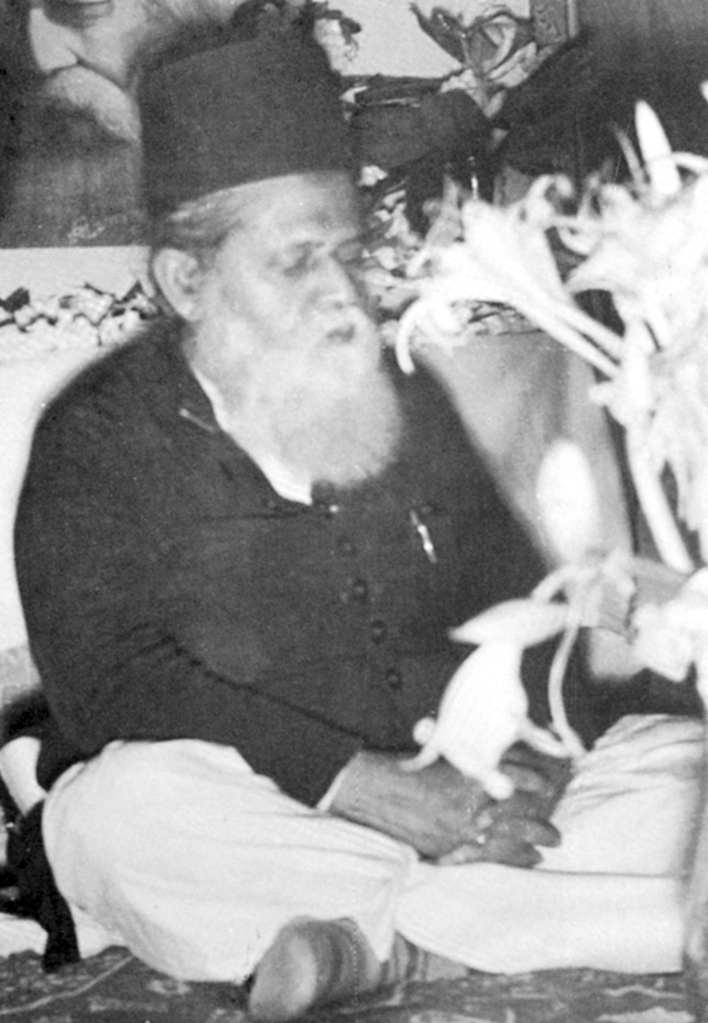
- Muhammad Shahidullah
  Munir Chowdhury, educationist
- Muhammad Shahidullah, Linguist
- Ahmed Sofa, poet and author
- Humayun Azad, poet and author
- A. F. Salahuddin Ahmed, historian
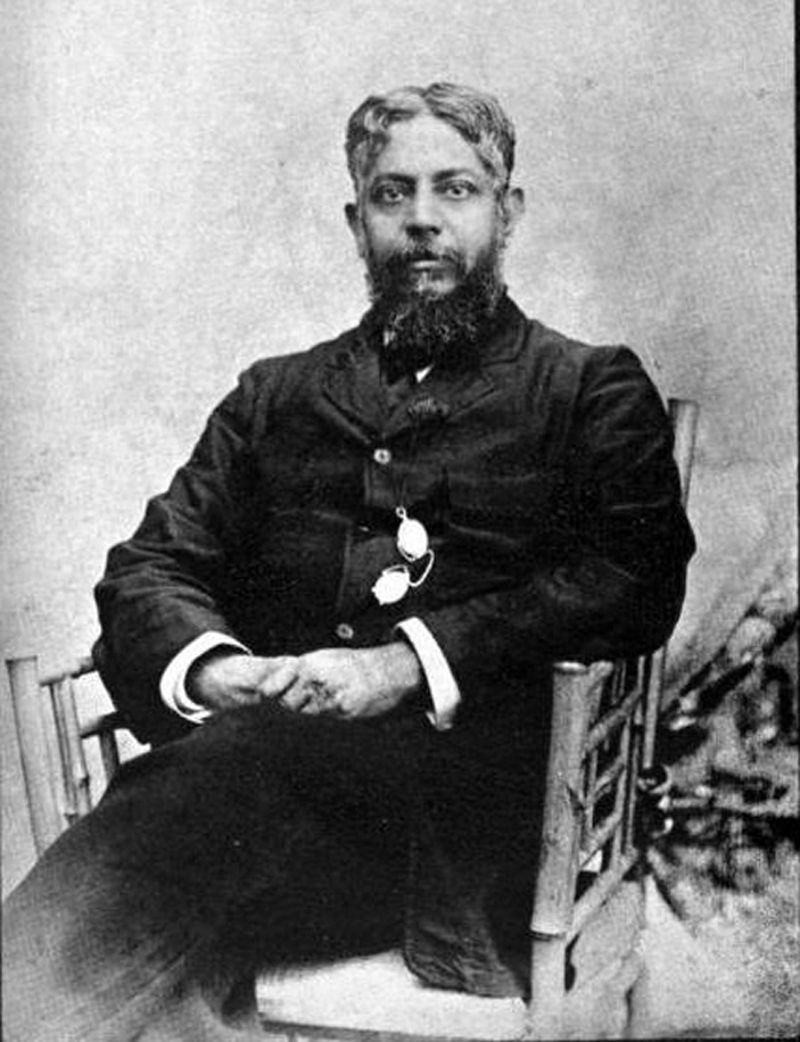
- Anandamohan Bose
  Santosh Chandra Bhattacharya, senior lecturer of the department of history at the University of Dhaka
- Anandamohan Bose, politician, academic, social reformer, and lawyer during the British Raj.
- Dhirendranath Datta, politician and lawyer who demanded in 1948 that Bengali be made an official language of Pakistan
- Govinda Chandra Dev, professor of Philosophy at the University of Dhaka. killed in onset of the Bangladesh Liberation War.
- Syed Modasser Ali, ophthalmologist
- Nikhilesh Dutta, Deputy Attorney General
- Kaberi Gayen, an academic, author, and social activist known for her views on the oppression of minorities and gender inequality in Bangladesh.
- Biswajit Ghosh (academic), professor, essayist and researcher.
- Jogesh Chandra Ghosh, Scholar, pioneering Ayurveda practitioner, entrepreneur and philanthropist who founded Sadhana Ausadhalaya
- Kaliprosanna Ghosh,19th century journalist, writer and scholar based in Bikrampur, Dhaka.
- Nirmalendu Goon, poet
- Jyotirmoy Guhathakurta, educator, literary critic, and Dhaka University professor
- Meghna Guhathakurta, retired professor of international relations of the University of Dhaka.
- Bimal Guha, poet
- Santosh Gupta (journalist), journalist and writer.
- Kangal Harinath, 19th century Bengali journalist, poet, writer and Baul singer.
- Kamal Hossain, lawyer and politician, civil rights activist
- Nasreen Pervin Huq, women's rights activist
- Roquia Sakhawat Hussain, writer, feminist, social worker
- Muhammed Abdul Muid Khan, human rights lawyer
- M S Khan, librarian and pioneer of library science in Bangladesh
- Mohammad Shahedul Anam Khan, defence analyst
- Krishna Chandra Majumder, a 19th-century Bengali poet and writer in Khulna.
- Natyaguru Nurul Momen, playwright, director, actor, academic, journalist, translator and poet
- Mirza Hussain Haider, former Justice of the Appellate Division of the Bangladesh Supreme Court
- Avijit Roy, writer professor of physics at the University of Dhaka, who received the Ekushey Padak award
- Dinesh Chandra Sen, educator and researcher who documented the history of the Bengali language and folk literature.
- Mohammad Yusuf Siddiq, historian, epigraphist, researcher, professor and author
- Surendra Kumar Sinha, a Bangladeshi lawyer and jurist who served as the 21st Chief Justice of Bangladesh.
- K. Mukhtar Elahi, poet and freedom fighter

== Government officials and diplomats ==
- Shakil Ahmed, Army general
- Nitai Roy Chowdhury, a lawyer and politician. incumbent Minister for Cultural Affairs.Earlier he has served as the Minister of Youth and Sports.
- Anwar Chowdhury, British High Commissioner to Dhaka, first non-White Briton to hold a senior diplomatic post
- Akbar Ali Khan, Bangladeshi economic historian and educationist who was a civil servant until 2001, Finance Ministry Adviser (Minister) of Caretaker government of Bangladesh
- A. H. M. Moniruzzaman, career diplomat belonging to the Bangladesh Foreign Service, was the head of Bangladesh Mission to the European Commission in Brussels, Belgium, Luxembourg and Switzerland
- Surendra Kumar Sinha, Chief Justice of Bangladesh (2015–2017)
- Bidhan Ranjan Roy Poddar, an adviser to the Interim government of Bangladesh.
- Ayub Quadri, retired bureaucrat, adviser for the ministries of Education and Cultural Affairs to Caretaker government of Bangladesh
- Kamal Uddin Siddiqui, senior lecturer at the Monash University, a political economist and social scientist and a bureaucrat from Bangladesh
- Quadrat Elahi Rahman Shafique, colonel in Bangladesh Army who died in the 2009 Bangladesh Rifles mutiny
- Sarwar Hossain, Army General and former Military Secretary to the President of Bangladesh.

== Noted diplomats and heads of major organizations ==
- Sunil Kanti Bose, Secretary of the Ministry of Posts, Telecommunications and Information Technology and the former chairperson of Bangladesh Telecommunication Regulatory Commission
- Pradip Ranjan Chakrabarty, the Chairman of the Bangladesh Competition Commission.He is a former member of the Bangladesh Planning Commission.
- Jishnu Roy Chowdhury, a civil servant and former ambassador of Bangladesh to Bhutan, advisor to Upay, United Commercial Bank PLC's mobile financial service provider.
- SK Sur Chowdhury, a former deputy governor of Bangladesh Bank, former banking reform adviser of Bangladesh Bank.
- Abul Fateh, professional diplomat, first Foreign Secretary 1971–1972
- Chandra Kalindi Roy Henriksen, Chief Secretary of the United Nations Permanent Forum on Indigenous Issues
- M Sakhawat Hossain, author, politician, and Brigadier General (retd) Bangladesh Army
- Irene Khan, former secretary general of Amnesty International, winner of the Sydney Peace Prize 2006
- Osman Ghani Khan, former chairman of the United Nations Board of Auditors (1980–1982), former Comptroller and Auditor General of Bangladesh (1976–1982), and former Defense Secretary of Bangladesh
- Shib Nath Roy, ambassador of Bangladesh to Bhutan.

== Religious personalities ==
- Sheikh Ahmadullah, Founder, As-Sunnah Foundation
- Shah Muhammad Nazrul Islam, Islamic Scholar and government official
- Fazlul Haque Amini (1945–2012), former principal of Jamia Qurania Arabia Lalbagh and politician
- Abul Kalam Azad (born 1947), preacher and Jamaat-e-Islami politician
- Junaid Babunagari (born 1955), former Amir of Hefazat-e-Islam Bangladesh
- Muhibbullah Babunagari (born 1935), current Amir of Hefazat-e-Islam Bangladesh
- Mahanambrata Brahmachari (1904-1999), a Hindu monk, writer, and scholar. head of Mahanam Sampradaya, and member of the Mahauddharana order
- Abdul Halim Bukhari (born 1945), Islamic scholar and chancellor of Al Jamia Al Islamia Patiya
- Anukulchandra Chakravarty (1888-1969), a physician, spiritual guru, and founder of the Satsang movement. His original Satsang Ashram is in Hemayetpur, Pabna.
- Abdul Matin Chowdhury (1915–1990), Shaykh of Fulbari and political activist
- Abdul Haque Faridi (1903–1996), founder of the Islami Bishwakosh project
- Nurul Islam Farooqi (1959–2014), Islamic scholar, businessman, politician, and preacher
- Abdul Latif Chowdhury Fultali (1913–2008), founder of the Fultali movement and Darul Hadis Latifiah
- Muhammad Asadullah Al-Ghalib (born 1948), reformist and founder of Ahle Hadith Andolon Bangladesh
- Nur Uddin Gohorpuri (1924–2005), chairman of Befaqul Madarisil Arabia Bangladesh
- Mahmudul Hasan, President of Al-Haiatul Ulya Lil-Jamiatil Qawmia Bangladesh and Befaqul Madarisil Arabia Bangladesh, Chancellor of Jamia Islamia Darul Uloom Madania, Amir of Majlis-e-Dawatul Haq Bangladesh
- Ubaidul Haq (1928–2007), former khatib of Baitul Mukarram
- Azizul Haque (1919–2012), first translator of Sahih Al-Bukhari into the Bengali language
- Mamunul Haque (born 1973), Islamic scholar and influential speaker
- Mahfuzul Haque (born 1969), Islamic scholar and politician
- A F M Khalid Hossain (born 1959), vice-president of Hefazat-e-Islam Bangladesh
- Hafezzi Huzur (1895–1997), founder of the Bangladesh Khilafat Andolan
- Abu Hena Saiful Islam (born 1963), imam of the US Navy
- Izharul Islam, founder of Jamiatul Uloom Al-Islamia Lalkhan Bazar
- Prabhu Jagadbandhu (1871-1921), a Hindu religious person who preached at the Sri Angan ashram in modern India and Bangladesh
- Sayyid Kamal ad-Din Jafri (born 1945), founder of the Bangladesh Islami University
- Abdul Jabbar Jahanabadi (1937–2016), former secretary-general of Befaqul Madarisil Arabia Bangladesh
- Nurul Islam Jihadi (born 1948), secretary-general of Hefazat-e-Islam Bangladesh
- Syed Rezaul Karim (born 1971), current Pir of Chormonai and leader of Islami Andolan Bangladesh
- Syed Fazlul Karim (1935–2006), former Pir of Chormonai and founder of Islami Andolan Bangladesh
- Nur Hossain Kasemi (1945–2020), former secretary-general of Hefazat-e-Islam Bangladesh
- Muhiuddin Khan (1935–2016), translator of the Qur'an and the Ma'ariful Qur'an exegesis
- Anandamayi Ma (1896-1982), a Bengali saint, teacher, and mystic. She was revered as an incarnation of Hindu goddess Durga.
- Ajmal Masroor (born 1971), British politician, imam and TV presenter
- Abdul Khaleque Mondal, Bangladesh Jamaat-e-Islami associate
- Abdur Rahim (1918–1987), inaugural Amir of the Bangladesh Jamaat-e-Islami
- Abdur Rahman (1920–2015), founder of Islamic Research Center Bangladesh
- Syed Mohammad Saifur Rahman Nizami (born 1916), islamic scholar and Ekushey Padak recipient
- Abu Zafar Mohammad Saleh, islamic scholar and Independence Award recipient
- Delwar Hossain Sayeedi (born 1940), Islamic scholar and Bangladesh Jamaat-e-Islami politician
- Shah Ahmad Shafi (1916–2020), former Amir of Hefazat-e-Islam Bangladesh
- Harichand Thakur (1812-1878), social reformer who worked among the untouchable people of the Bengal Presidency, founder of the Matua Mahasangha sect of Hinduism.
- Ram Thakur (1860-1949), yogi, monk, and hindu spiritual leader believed by some to be an avatar of Lord Vishnu
- Nurul Islam Walipuri (born 1955), mufassir, teacher and author
- Muhammad Waqqas (1952–2021), former secretary-general of Jamiat Ulema-e-Islam Bangladesh
- Obaidul Haque Wazirpuri (1934–2008), former co-president of Befaqul Madarisil Arabia Bangladesh

== Sports people ==
=== Cricket ===
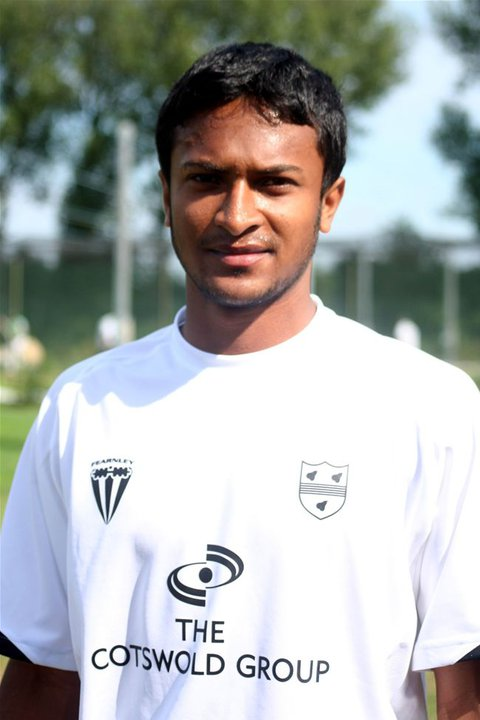
- Shakib Al Hasan
  Alok Kapali, all rounder
- Dhiman Ghosh, wicketkeeper-batsman
- Shakib Al Hasan, all-rounder
- Mashrafe Mortaza, pace bowler and most successful captain of Bangladesh
- Mohammad Ashraful, youngest player to hit a ton in Test Cricket
- Tamim Iqbal, test, ODI and t20 batsman
- Mahmudullah, top 10 T20I all rounders
- Mushfiqur Rahim, wicketkeeper batsman
- Mustafizur Rahman, got man match on test and ODI debut
- Taijul Islam, took hat trick on ODI debut and has recorded an eight wicket haul
- Mehidy Hasan, Man Series debut
- Nayeem Hasan, 5/61 test debut
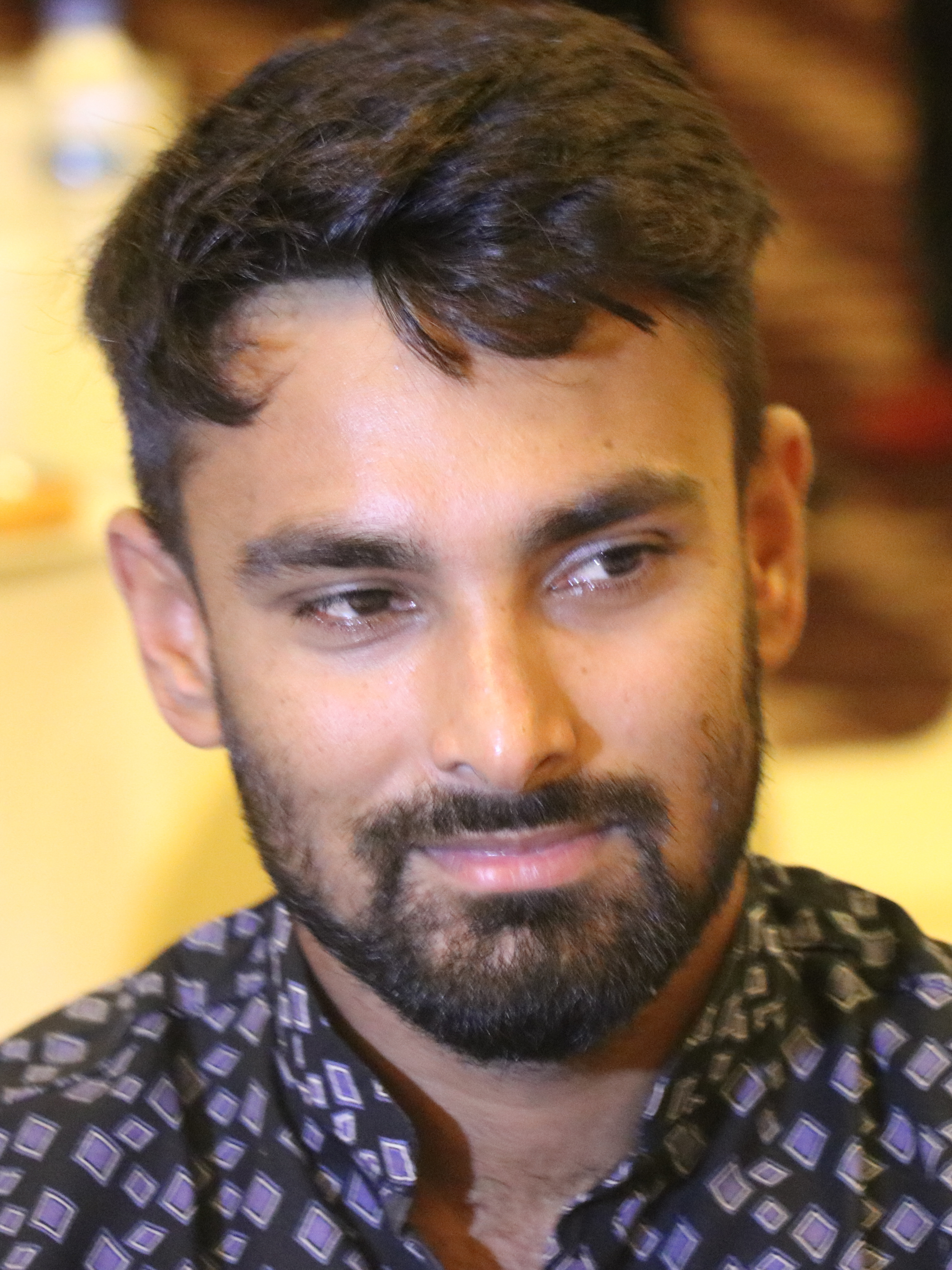
- Liton Das
  Nasum Ahmed, bowler
- Soumya Sarkar, all rounder
- Mominul Haque, test batsmen
- Imrul Kayes, test and ODI batsman
- Shafiul Islam, ODI and t20 bowler
- Mohammad Saifuddin, all rounder
- Mosaddek Hossain, all rounder
- Rubel Hossain, fast bowler
- Shuvagata Hom, batsman and off-break bowler
- Syed Rasel, fast bowler
- Abdur Razzak, spin bowler
- Liton Das, wicket keeper, batsman
- Tamim Iqbal
  Ranjan Das, left-arm fast bowler who played in Bangladesh's inaugural, historic first-ever Test match
- Rony Talukdar, batsman
- Subashis Roy, test and ODI cricketer
- Tapash Baisya, medium-fast bowler
- Taskin Ahmed, speedstar
- Nahid Rana, fastest bowler of Bangladesh
- Najmul Hossain Shanto, batsman
- Sabbir Rahman, one of hard hitter
- Nasir Hossain, one of best filder

=== Archery ===
- Emdadul Haque Milon, archer
- Md Ruman Shana

=== Chess ===
- Abdullah Al Rakib, Bangladeshi Grandmaster
- Reefat Bin-Sattar, Bangladeshi Grandmaster
- Rani Hamid, chess player; was awarded the FIDE Woman International Master (WIM) title in 1985 and won British Women's Championship (1983, 1985, 1989)
- Enamul Hossain, Bangladeshi Grandmaster
- Niaz Morshed, first Bangladeshi Grandmaster (as well as South Asia)
- Ziaur Rahman, Bangladeshi Grandmaster

=== Football ===
- Abdus Salam Murshedy, holds the record for most goals scored in a single domestic league season
- Alfaz Ahmed, Sylheti footballer
- Aminul Haque, goalkeeper
- Ashish Bhadra, former national team captain
- Ashraf Uddin Ahmed Chunnu, all-time leading goalscorer of the national team
- AKM Nowsheruzzaman
- Chinghla Mong Chowdhury Mari, played for the Pakistan national team
- Elias Hossain
- Enayetur Rahman Khan, first goalscorer for the national team
- Golam Sarwar Tipu, played for the Pakistan national team
- Hemanta Vincent Biswas, first Bangladeshi footballer to get a trial at a top European club;
- Hamza Choudhury, English Bangladeshi Footballer; first Bangladeshi player to ever play in English Premier League.
- Imtiaz Ahmed Nakib
- Jamal Bhuyan, Danish footballer of Bangladeshi descent
- Kaiser Hamid, Sylheti, footballer, son of Rani Hamid (retired)
- Kazi Salahuddin, first Bangladeshi to play in a professional football league
- Khandoker Wasim Iqbal
- Khurshid Alam Babul
- Mamunul Islam
- Mamun Joarder
- Mohamed Zahid Hossain
- Mohammed Mohsin, former national team captain
- Md Mohsin, goalkeeper
- Monwar Hossain Nannu
- Motiur Rahman Munna
- Monem Munna, first Bangladeshi captain to win a trophy with the national team
- Rajani Kanta Barman
- Syed Rumman Bin Wali Sabbir
- Rezaul Karim Rehan
- Rizvi Karim Rumi
- Sayeed Hassan Kanan, goalkeeper
- Shamit Shome, Canadian Bangladeshi footballer.
- Shahid Uddin Ahmed Selim, national team captain at the 1980 AFC Asian Cup
- Shahidur Rahman Shantoo, goalkeeper
- Sheikh Mohammad Aslam, all-time leading goalscorer in the domestic league
- Sheikh Shaheb Ali, first head coach of the national team
- Topu Barman
- Tariq Kazi, Finnish Bangladeshi footballer
- Zahid Hasan Ameli

=== Golf ===
- Siddikur Rahman, Bangladeshi pro golfer who plays on the Asian Tour

=== Gymnastics ===
- Syque Caesar, artistic gymnast, member of the Michigan Wolverines
- Margarita Mamun, rhythmic gymnast, 2016 Gold medallist and Olympic champion in rhythmic gymnastics of Russian and Bangladeshi descent

=== Hockey ===
- Mamunur Rahman Chayan
- Asim Gope (GK)
- Farhad Shetul
- Khorshadur Rahman
- Roman Sarkar
- Rashel Mahmud
- Fazla Rabby
- Milon Hossain
- Sobuj Shohanur
- Sarower Hossain
- Naim Uddin
- Ashraful Islam
- Arshad Hossain
- Abu Nippon (GK)

=== Kabaddi ===
- Kazi Yunus Ahmed
- Razu Ahmed
- Hena Akhter
- Rupali Akhter
- Kazi Shahin Ara
- Farzana Akhter Baby
- Juni Chakma, of Chakma descent
- Mohammed Mozammal Haque
- Kamal Hossain
- Mosharrof Hossain
- Abul Kalam
- Shahnaz Parvin Maleka
- Badsha Miah, of Sylheti descent
- Kochi Rani Mondal
- Abu Salah Musa
- Ismat Ara Nishi
- Fatema Akhter Poly
- Md Mizanur Rahman
- Ziaur Rahman
- Bozlur Rashid
- Sharmin Sultana Rima
- Md Abdur Rouf
- Dolly Shefali

=== Martial arts ===
- Riaz Amin, youngest British Bangladeshi WEKAF (World Eskrima/Kali/Arnis Federation) world champion, practises Shotokan Karate and Filipino Martial Arts uni
- Ruqsana Begum, first British woman in kickboxing to be Asian, Bangladeshi and Muslim, practises Muay Thai
- Ali Jacko, British Bangladeshi World Champion Lightweight Kickboxer, black belt in Jujitsu, Wushu and Chinese Boxing
- Mak Yuree, founder of Butthan, Vajrapran and Combat Self-Defense, holds four world records

=== Mountaineering ===
- Musa Ibrahim
- Wasfia Nazreen, also social activist
- Mohammad Shamsuzzaman Arafat

=== Sport shooters ===
- Mohammad Imam Hossain
- Asif Hossain Khan, gold and silver medalist in the Commonwealth Games
- Sharmin Ratna

=== Sprinters ===
- Masbah Ahmmed, 100m sprinter
- Mohan Khan, personal best 11.25
- Beauty Nazmun Nahar, personal best 12.52
- Imranur Rahman British Bangladeshi sprinter. Fastest Bangladeshi man. Personal Best 10.11 seconds.

=== Swimming ===
- Brojen Das, swimmer, first Asian to swim across the English Channel and the first person to cross it four times

=== Table tennis ===
- Zobera Rahman Linu, table tennis player; 16 times national champion, Guinness World Record holder

== See also ==
- List of Bangladeshi Americans
- List of Bengalis
- List of British Bangladeshis
- List of Bangladeshi architects
- List of Bangladeshi painters
- List of Bangladeshi poets
- List of Bangladesh-related topics
- List of Bangladesh Test cricketers
- List of Bangladeshi writers
- List of ethnic minority officials in Bangladesh
