= Kabaddi at the 2010 Asian Games =

- Venue: Nansha Gymnasium
- Dates: 22–26 November 2010
- Competitors: 169 from 10 nations

Kabaddi at the 2010 Asian Games was held in Nansha Gymnasium, Guangzhou, China from November 22 to 26, 2010.

== Schedule ==
P	Preliminary round	½	Semifinals	F	Final

Event↓/Date →	22nd Mon	23rd Tue	24th Wed	25th Thu	26th Fri
Men	P	P	P	½	F
Women	P	P	P	½	F

== Medalists ==
Event	Gold	Silver	Bronze
Men	India; Jasmer Singh; Samarjeet; Anup Kumar; Jeeva Kumar; Manjeet Chhillar; Sonu Narwal; Rakesh Kumar; Jasmer; Navneet Gautam; Kaptan Singh; Nitin Ghule; Jagdeep Singh	Iran; Reza Kamali Moghaddam; Morteza Shahidi; Nasser Roumiani; Fazel Atrachali; Meisam Abbasi; Mehdi Mousavi; Siamak Rezagholi; Abouzar Mohajer; Mehdi Safaeian; Kianoush Naderian; Ebad Dalili; Mostafa Nodehi	Japan; Kokei Ito; Hiromi Takahashi; Kazuhiro Takano; Terukazu Nitta; Kazuaki Murakami; Masayuki Ota; Ryota Nakajima; Ryokei Kushige; Yoji Kawai; Yudai Yamagishi; Taiki Nama; Masayuki Shimokawa
Men	India; Jasmer Singh; Samarjeet; Anup Kumar; Jeeva Kumar; Manjeet Chhillar; Sonu Narwal; Rakesh Kumar; Jasmer; Navneet Gautam; Kaptan Singh; Nitin Ghule; Jagdeep Singh	Iran; Reza Kamali Moghaddam; Morteza Shahidi; Nasser Roumiani; Fazel Atrachali; Meisam Abbasi; Mehdi Mousavi; Siamak Rezagholi; Abouzar Mohajer; Mehdi Safaeian; Kianoush Naderian; Ebad Dalili; Mostafa Nodehi	Pakistan; Nasir Ali; Wajid Ali; Waseem Sajjad; Muhammad Khalid; Muhammad Arshad; Ibrar Hussain; Abrar Khan; Maqsood Ali; Abdul Mukhtar; Atif Waheed; Akhlaq Hussain; Muhammad Ali
Women	India; Snehal Sampat Salunkhe; Kavitha Selvaraj; V. Tejeswini Bai; Sanahanbi Devi; Pooja Sharma; Kavita; Manisha; Deepika Henry Joseph; Shermi Ulahannan; Mamatha Poojary; Kalyani Marella; Smita Kumari	Thailand; Alisa Limsamran; Namfon Kangkeeree; Chonlada Chaiprapan; Kamontip Suwanchana; Treeveeraporn Tongnun; Janjira Panprasert; Atchara Puangngern; Nuchanart Maiwan; Sutarat Thonghun; Yaowaret Nitsara; Wattakan Kammachot; Naleerat Ketsaro	Bangladesh; Shahnaz Parvin Maleka; Maleka Parvin; Farzana Akhter Baby; Juni Chakma; Kazi Shahin Ara; Rupali Akhter; Sharmin Sultana Rima; Dolly Shefali; Fatema Akhter Poly; Kochi Rani Mondal; Hena Akhter; Ismat Ara Nishi
Women	India; Snehal Sampat Salunkhe; Kavitha Selvaraj; V. Tejeswini Bai; Sanahanbi Devi; Pooja Sharma; Kavita; Manisha; Deepika Henry Joseph; Shermi Ulahannan; Mamatha Poojary; Kalyani Marella; Smita Kumari	Thailand; Alisa Limsamran; Namfon Kangkeeree; Chonlada Chaiprapan; Kamontip Suwanchana; Treeveeraporn Tongnun; Janjira Panprasert; Atchara Puangngern; Nuchanart Maiwan; Sutarat Thonghun; Yaowaret Nitsara; Wattakan Kammachot; Naleerat Ketsaro	Iran; Soheila Solbi; Fatemeh Momeni; Saeideh Maghsoudloo; Maliheh Miri; Shilan Sharezouli; Ghazal Khalaj; Farideh Zarifdoust; Zahra Masoumabadi; Samira Shabani; Salimeh Abdollahbakhsh; Marzieh Eshghi; Sedigheh Jafari

== Medal table ==
Rank	Nation	Gold	Silver	Bronze	Total
1	India (IND)	2	0	0	2
2	Iran (IRI)	0	1	1	2
3	Thailand (THA)	0	1	0	1
4	Bangladesh (BAN)	0	0	1	1
4	Japan (JPN)	0	0	1	1
4	Pakistan (PAK)	0	0	1	1
Totals (6 entries)		2	2	4	8

== Draw ==
=== Men ===
The teams were seeded based on their final ranking at the 2006 Asian Games.

Group A

- India (1)
- Iran (4)
- South Korea

Group B

- Pakistan (2)
- Bangladesh (3)
- Malaysia
- Japan

=== Women ===
The teams were seeded based on their final ranking at the 2008 Asian Championship.

Group A

- Iran
- Thailand
- Malaysia
- Chinese Taipei

Group B

- India
- Nepal
- South Korea
- Bangladesh

== Final standing ==
=== Men ===
Rank	Team	Pld	W	D	L
1st place, gold medalist(s)	India	4	4	0	0
2nd place, silver medalist(s)	Iran	4	2	0	2
3rd place, bronze medalist(s)	Japan	4	2	0	2
3rd place, bronze medalist(s)	Pakistan	4	3	0	1
5	Bangladesh	3	1	0	2
5	South Korea	2	0	0	2
7	Malaysia	3	0	0	3

=== Women ===
Rank	Team	Pld	W	D	L
1st place, gold medalist(s)	India	5	5	0	0
2nd place, silver medalist(s)	Thailand	5	4	0	1
3rd place, bronze medalist(s)	Bangladesh	4	2	0	2
3rd place, bronze medalist(s)	Iran	4	2	0	2
5	Chinese Taipei	3	1	0	2
5	South Korea	3	1	0	2
7	Malaysia	3	0	0	3
7	Nepal	3	0	0	3
