= Bring Your Own Spoon =

2017 short story by Saad Z. Hossain

- Short story by Saad Z. Hossain
- Country: Bangladesh
- Language: English
- Genre: Science fiction

Publication
- Published in: The Djinn Falls in Love and Other Stories
- Publisher: Solaris
- Publication date: 2017

"Bring Your Own Spoon" is a short story by Bangladeshi writer Saad Z. Hossain. It was first published in 2017 as part of the short story collection The Djinn Falls in Love and Other Stories (2017). It was later also featured in The Gollancz Book of South Asian Science Fiction Vol. 2 (2022).

Set in the same universe as his novels Djinn City (2017), The Gurkha and the Lord of Tuesday (2019), Cyber Mage (2021) and Kundo Wakes Up (2022), the story follows a young man and a djinn opening a restaurant in a dystopian Dhaka.

== Setting ==
The narrative is set in the same peri-apocalyptic, futuristic Dhaka featured in Cyber Mage. In this society, humans and djinn coexist in an environment heavily damaged by ecological degradation and corporate monopolies. All citizens are embedded with microchips that allow them to enter virtual reality, as well as emit biotechnology called "nanites", which clean the air and establish localised "microclimates".

The socioeconomically disadvantaged population resides in the "Fringe", an area of impoverished slums along the riverbanks of Narayanganj. Designated as a "Red Zone", the area suffers from severe pollution that has poisoned the local environment and river. Due to the high risk of contamination, residents avoid natural food sources and primarily rely on artificial food generated by "food synthesizers".

== Plot ==
Hanu Khillick, a human, and Imbidor, a djinn, establish a joint eatery within the Fringe. They secure a building free of rent from a brusque smuggler named Karka, in exchange for assistance through Imbidor's powers. Over the course of six months, the duo feeds the local population by foraging, fishing in the contaminated river and accepting donations of ingredients as payment. Their restaurant eventually becomes a regular gathering along the riverbank, establishing a community.

However, law enforcement officers soon arrive to detain the group for organizing unauthorized activity within the Red Zone. To de-escalate the situation, Imbidor offers one of them fish-head curry which the guard, despite initial fascination, refuses to eat. The encounter escalates, and the police assault Hanu, Imbidor and Karka. Karka is fatally mauled by police drones. Before departing, the officers announce that all individuals present have had their microchips tagged for systematic termination.

Hanu convinces the gathered community to evacuate the zone by boat, reasoning that the presence of fish in the local river indicates viable food sources exist elsewhere. He proposes that they use Imbidor's djinn abilities to establish new microclimates and survive outside the city. Imbidor condemns the system the population lives under, under constant surveillance and threat of death while their nanites are exploited for the benefit of the wealthy elite.

The narrative concludes with the residents following them onto the boats, leaving it ambiguous whether they are motivated by resignation or hope.

== Characters ==
- Hanu: A chef living in a near-future Dhaka who prepares traditional meals using scavenged ingredients rather than corporate-produced synthetic food. He establishes a restaurant to serve the local community.
- Imbidor ("Imbi"): A djinn who has recently awoken from a centuries-old sleep. He partners with Hanu to run the restaurant, using his powers to help the impoverished citizens.
- Karka: A smuggler who, while initially skeptical of Hanu and Imbidor's endeavour, later agrees to provide them with shelter and protection.

== Relationship to Hossain's Novels ==
The narrative would later go on to be the basis for Hossain’s Cyber Mage. In addition to the basic technological framework, many of the elements featured in the short story return in the novel. The security forces who ambush the protagonists are depicted as serving the antagonistic corporation, Securex, in Cyber Mage. While Hanu is not mentioned by name, the novel mentions human chefs who continue serving food to the cardless in Dhaka. Imbidor’s past is also a reference to Hossain’s older work, the Gangaridai lineage to which he belongs first mentioned in Djinn City.

== Reception ==
The story has been noted for its depiction of the use of traditional cooking as a form of solidarity and resistance against corporate-controlled food scarcity. Panda and Bhattacharya view the story through the lens of James Scott's theory of everyday resistance, connecting the themes in the story to contemporary crises caused by corporate agribusinesses or food shortages faced by Rohingya refugees. Maria Haskins praises the story for its depiction of food as not only a source of nourishment but also of hope.

== See also ==
- Science fantasy
- Slipstream fiction
