= Nikhilesh =

Nikhilesh may refer to:

- Nikhilesh Dutta, (born 1939) Bangladeshi barrister
- Nikhilesh Surendran, (born 1992) Indian cricketer
