= Kaptan Singh =

Indian kabaddi player

Medal record

Representing India

Men's Kabaddi

Asian Games
Gold medal – first place	2010 Guangzhou	Team

Kaptan Singh (born 4 April 1986) is representative for India in the sport of Kabaddi. He was a member of the Kabaddi team that won a gold medal in the 2010 Asian games in Guangzhou.
