= Jasmer Singh =

Indian kabaddi player

Medal record

Representing India

Men's Kabaddi

Asian Games
Gold medal – first place	2010 Guangzhou	Team

Jasmer Singh Gulia (born 18 March 1987) is representative for India in the sport of Kabaddi. He was a member of the kabaddi team that won a gold medal in the 2010 Asian games in Guangzhou.
