= Cyber Mage =

2021 novel by Saad Z. Hossain

- First edition cover
- Author: Saad Z. Hossain
- Language: English
- Series: Djinn City
- Genre: Science fiction
- Publisher: Unnamed Press
- Publication date: 2021
- ISBN: 978-1-951-21328-2
- Preceded by: Djinn City (2017)
- Followed by: The Gurkha and the Lord of Tuesday (2019)

Cyber Mage is a 2021 novel by Bangladeshi author Saad Z. Hossain, and the third installment in the Djinn City series. Set in a dystopian Dhaka, the narrative follows a teenage hacker and a golem mercenary who form an alliance after becoming entangled in a larger conflict between corporate syndicates and ancient djinn.

== Setting ==
The plot takes place in Dhaka in the year 2089. Due to a global climate apocalypse, the city has embedded biological nanotech into its citizens' bodies, allowing them to emit 'nanites', technology that purifies the air and grant them biological enhancements. Through the nanites, the people are able to maintain 'microclimates' which allow them to survive in livable temperatures.

The world is governed largely by artificial intelligence, with humans having access to a global system of virtual reality known as "the Virtuality" through a microchip embedded in their brains known as the "Echochip". In the novel, the concept of modern nationhood has become obsolete. Instead, the world is divided into areas controlled by private corporations. Shareholders live in these territories, while the non-shareholders-- referred to as the "cardless"-- reside in the outskirts, allowed to stay solely for the nanites they release which cleanse the air for the more privileged. Although some are skeptical of their existence, the world is also populated by djinn, who come into conflict with human affairs.

== Plot ==
Fifteen-year-old Marzuk lives in the Tri-State Corp, an elite enclave for wealthy shareholders. Known online as the "Cyber Mage," Marzuk is a top player of the MMORPG Final Fantasy 9000 and moonlights as a hacker for the Russian mob. His closest confidante is a fellow hacker known online as "KPopRetroGirl" (“ReGi”). He also encounters a powerful artificial intelligence capable of influencing both computer systems and his own mind, with no known origin or identity. He dubs her Kali, hiding her within the Final Fantasy 9000 servers.

Seeking a romantic relationship with a local student named Amina, Marzuk enrolls in her high school. He faces severe ostracisation and bullying from Hinku, an influential student whose family works for Securex, a premier intelligence agency. Marzuk’s only ally on campus is the school's artificial intelligence, "the Mongolian." After Hinku attempts to drug Amina, Marzuk intervenes by flooding the school, resulting in his suspension.

Under ReGi’s urging, Marzuk has been closely following the activities of Djibrel, whom he believes to be a serial killer in the cardless slums. In reality, Djibrel is a golem of the ancient djinn Bahamut, gifted a powerful sword forged by the Dragon, the new identity of part-djinn Indelbed Khan-Rahman. Assigned to a quest by Bahamut to slay his enemies, Djibrel works as an assassin, decapitating his victims and carrying their heads with him. He forms an allyship with Arna, a programmer, and her brother Leto, as he searches for an enigmatic coder he is told is involved with Securex in building a god AI. Djibrel is attacked by another djinn and injured before the Dragon intervenes to save them.

Meanwhile, Arna hires Marzuk to help them target Securex. Not only is Securex involved in illegal arms trade, it has gained access to control EchoChips, allowing them to harm, detain or even kill people at will. Marzuk and ReGi release a virus into their servers, setting them on fire after stealing their data. He realises Securex has also been funnelling money to the International Space Station (ISS).

Marzuk steps outside the Tri-State to meet up with Arna and the others, discovering that Indelbed is his ancestor. They discover that the Russians are Securex’s allies and have their location. Soon, they find themselves surrounded by Securex soldiers. They take shelter at Marzuk’s school, seeking protection from Mongolian.

The god AI, Karma, is revealed to belong to Matteras, a djinn who wishes to gain unified control over the earth. Believing humans to be incapable, he wishes to replace the present system of separate corporate oligarchies with an AI at the helm. Operating from the ISS, through Karma, Matteras seizes control over Securex, Dhaka and the Tri-State. Securex takes Marzuk's parents hostage.

Marzuk realises the Final Fantasy 9000 server remains the only server not under Securex control. With Securex forces surrounding the school, Marzuk coordinates a defence with Kali, Leto, Arna, Djibrel, and the Mongolian, successfully stopping impending bombings while framing Hinku's family for the Securex server fire. When a faction of djinn arrives to confront them, ReGi is revealed to be a djinn, the daughter of Matteras, and the creator of both Karma and Kali. To prevent a catastrophic physical war between the two god AIs, Marzuk proposes settling the dispute through a match in Final Fantasy 9000. Marzuk and Kali successfully defeat ReGi and Karma in the game. Conceding defeat, Matteras agrees to withdraw from Dhaka to target other cities, warning Marzuk that he is now responsible for the unstable city's imminent collapse. ReGi kisses Marzuk goodbye before departing with her father.

== Reception ==
Gary K. Wolfe praised the book for its sharp dialogue and unique blend of mythology with sci-fi.

== See also ==
- Bring Your Own Spoon, an earlier short story by Hossain in the same setting.
- Neurotechnology
- Science fantasy
