= Independent Television (Bangladesh) =

Private news source in Bangladesh

- Country: Bangladesh
- Broadcast area: Nationwide
- Headquarters: Tejgaon, Dhaka

Programming
- Language: Bengali
- Picture format: 16:9 SDTV

Ownership
- Owner: BEXIMCO

History
- Launched: 28 July 2011; 15 years ago

Links
- Website: www.itvbd.com

Independent Television

YouTube information
- Channel: Independent Television
- Years active: 2011
- Genre: News
- Subscribers: 12.6 million
- Last updated: 10 November 2026

Independent Television (Bengali: ইনডিপেনডেন্ট টেলিভিশন), also known as ITV, is a Bangladeshi Bengali-language privately owned satellite and cable 24-hour news television channel owned by BEXIMCO, one of the largest Bangladeshi conglomerates. The channel commenced transmissions on 28 July 2011, and is headquartered in Tejgaon, Dhaka.

== History ==
In January 2010, India-based NDTV collaborated with BEXIMCO with the goal of launching a Bangladeshi news channel, which was given a broadcasting license by the Bangladesh Telecommunication Regulatory Commission on 20 October 2009. Independent Television commenced test transmissions on 20 October 2010 and officially began broadcasting on 28 July 2011.

Toufique Imrose Khalidi, the veteran journalist of the country was appointed as the editor-in-chief, however, he was replaced by the existing CEO and editor-in-chief M Shamsur Rahman before commercial launching. It is the first television channel in Bangladesh to use the MPEG-4 technology to broadcast, and the workflow was designed in the concept of Media Asset Management (MAM) for multi-profile distribution by the technology team led by its chief technology officer Anowarul Azim.

Independent Television produced a quiz show titled Bangladesh Jiggasha, which premiered on the channel on 12 October 2018. In December 2018, the channel began broadcasting using the Bangabandhu-1 satellite.

== Programming ==
Independent Television usually broadcasts news programming. It has introduced an open newsroom studio presentation concept and connected to six divisional bureau offices for on-screen live news analysis from its first on-aired news and popular talk show Ajker Bangladesh, which Khaled Muhiuddin hosted earlier. Other programs include Rat 9 Tar Bangladesh, Joto Khela, Talash, and Goal. It also covers shows on culture, business, and entertainment. During several occasions such as holidays, Independent Television broadcasts special programming, such as Bazar Sodai, a shopping program aired on the last day of the month of Ramadan, observing Eid al-Fitr.

== Controversies ==
Shortly after the resignation of prime minister Sheikh Hasina on 5 August 2024, the headquarters of Independent Television was attacked and vandalized by mobs. Despite being one of the several channels whose headquarters were vandalized, it remained on the air. On 13 August 2024, the editor-in-chief and CEO of Independent Television, M Shamsur Rahman, was banned from leaving Bangladesh by a Dhaka court amid investigations into alleged involvement in laundering billions of taka linked to BEXIMCO vice chairman Salman F Rahman, as well as alleged embezzlement of 360 billion BDT from multiple banks. A defamation case was filed against the channel by Bangladeshi conglomerate Orion Group on 19 September 2024, accusing the channel of constantly airing misleading reports on the conglomerate allegedly embezzling governmental funds and laundering money.

== See also ==
- List of television stations in Bangladesh
