= Mohammad Shamsuzzaman Arafat =

Indian Banker

Ironman Arafat
- মোহাম্মদ সামছুজ্জামান আরাফাত
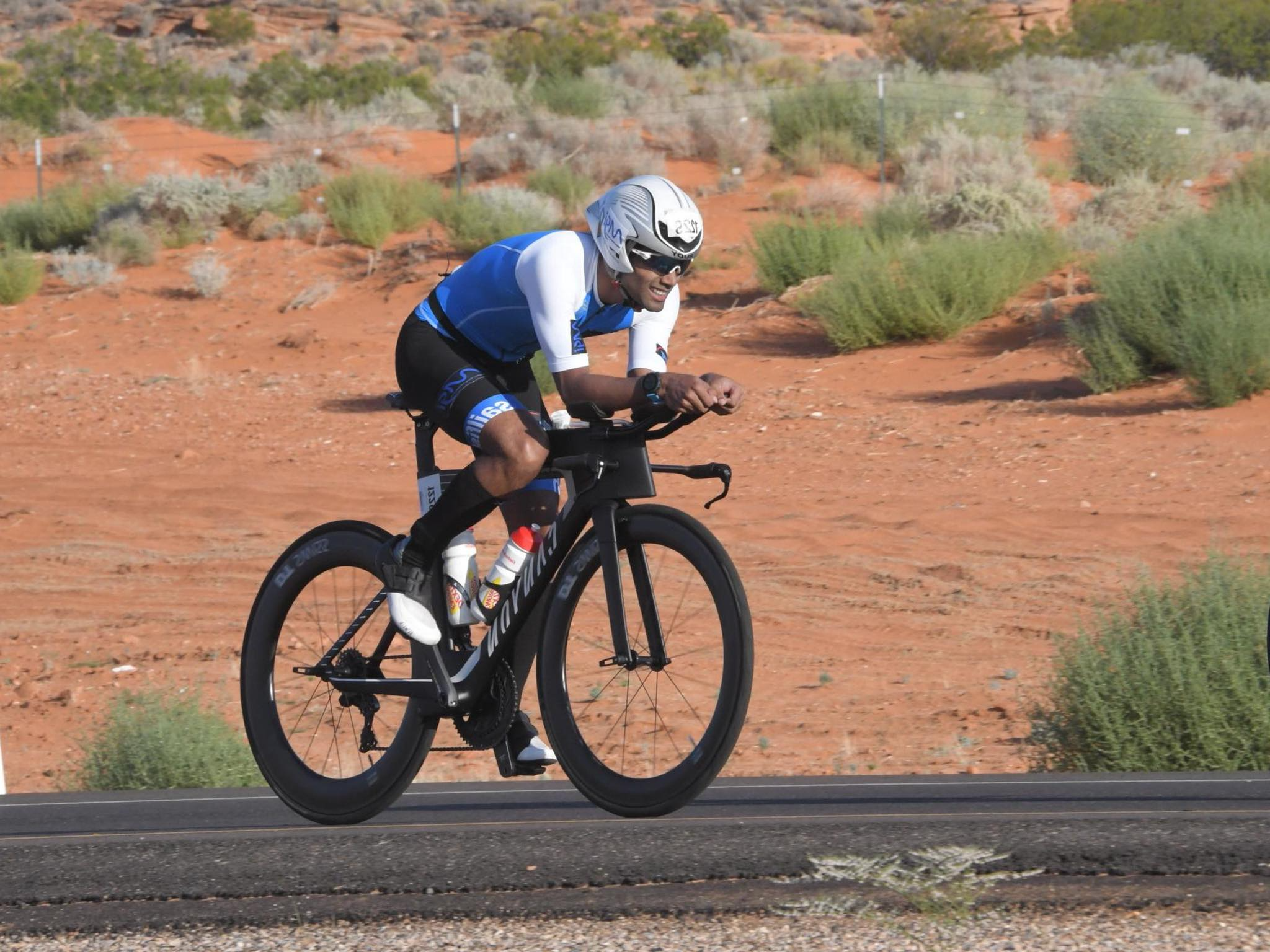
- Born: Mohammad Shamsuzzaman Arafat
- Education: University of Dhaka
- Occupations: Trialathlete; Central banker
- Website: www.triathletearafat.com

Mohammad Shamsuzzaman Arafat (born 10 January, 1990; Bengali: মোহাম্মদ সামছুজ্জামান আরাফাত), known colloquially as "Ironman Arafat," is a triathlete from Bangladesh. He is known for his participation and achievements in endurance sports, particularly in triathlons.

== Early life & education ==
Arafat born on 10 January 1990. He graduated from the Marketing Department of University of Dhaka. Arafat is employed as a joint director at the Bangladesh Bank.

== Career ==
=== Sports career ===
Arafat undertook his first mountain climbing expedition in Khagrachari in 2010. At that time, Dhaka University's administration was forming a team for the Everest Mission. Arafat enrolled in a training camp, which trained around 150 participants for two months. Following the training, a group of seven individuals, including Arafat, were selected for the mission. However, Arafat eventually did not get to participate in that mission due to him not having a passport at that time. Arafat participated in a half marathon in Cox's Bazar in 2013. In 2015, he swam across the Bangla Channel (16.1 km long open sea swimming route from Shapuree Island to Saint Martin's Island) and every year he repeated this swim. In 2016, he ran a marathon in Meghalaya. He covered a distance of 42 kilometers running in 4 hours and 41 minutes. In 2017, he initiated a running endeavor from Teknaf to Tetulia. He completed the run in 20 days, covering a distance of nearly 1,000 kilometers, and subsequently was awarded by the Palli Karma Sahayak Foundation (PKSF) and was made their goodwill ambassador for cultural and sports programs.

=== Triathlon ===
In 2017, Arafat attended the Ironman Malaysia. He completed the Ironman Malaysia in 12 hours and 43 minutes, including a 3.8-kilometer swim, 180-kilometer cycling, and 42-kilometer run. He became the first Bangladeshi athlete to complete both the Ironman 70.3 World Championship and the Ironman World Championship. He has finished five full Ironman distance and five completions of the Ironman 70.3 distance. He came in 2nd place in his age group and overall 10th place in the Ironman Malaysia 2022 competition. In addition, he achieved the 2nd position in the Ironman 70.3 Goa, India, and 8th place overall. Arafat was awarded the All-World Athlete - Gold distinction by the Ironman All-World Athlete organization in 2022.

His other participations in triathlons include the completion of the 70.3 World Championship in Saint George Town on September 18, 2021, Ironman Malaysia 2017, Ironman European Championship 2019 in Frankfurt, Germany, Ironman Malaysia 2019, and the 70.3 Ironman challenge in Thailand in 2020, and Ironman World Championship 2022 in the US, 2023 Ironman 70.3 World Championship, Ironman World Championship, Berlin Marathon and Ironman Malaysia, respectively taking place in Finland, France, Germany and Malaysia.

In August 2023, Arafat achieved 2023 Ironman Gold All-World Athlete status for his performance during the 2022 racing season.

=== Swimming ===
Arafat has swum across the Bangla Channel nine times in eight consecutive years.

== In popular culture ==
- Arafat was featured in a Chorki documentary titled "Ironman," directed by Redoan Rony and produced by Anisul Hoque, was made by Prothom Alo. It was released in November 2021.
