= Snehal Salunkhe =

Indian kabaddi player

Medal record

Representing India

Women's Kabaddi

Asian Games
Gold medal – first place	2010 Guangzhou	Team

Snehal Sampat Salunkhe is a kabaddi player from India. She was a member of the Indian team that won a gold medal at the 2010 Asian Games held in Guangzhou.
