= Kavita (kabaddi, born 1987) =

Indian kabaddi player

Medal record

Representing India

Women's Kabaddi

Asian Games
Gold medal – first place	2010 Guangzhou	Team

Kavita (born 12 December 1987) is a kabaddi player from India. She was a member of the team that won a gold medal in the 2010 Asian games in Guangzhou.
