= Maleka Parvin =

Bangladeshi kabaddi player

Medal record

Representing Bangladesh

Women's Kabaddi

Asian Games
Bronze medal – third place	2010 Guangzhou	Team

Maleka Parvin (Bengali: মালেকা পারভীন) is a Bangladeshi national women Kabaddi player who was part of the team that won the bronze medal at the 2010 Asian Games. She also participated in 2014 Asian Games.
