= Kavitha Selvaraj =

Indian kabaddi player

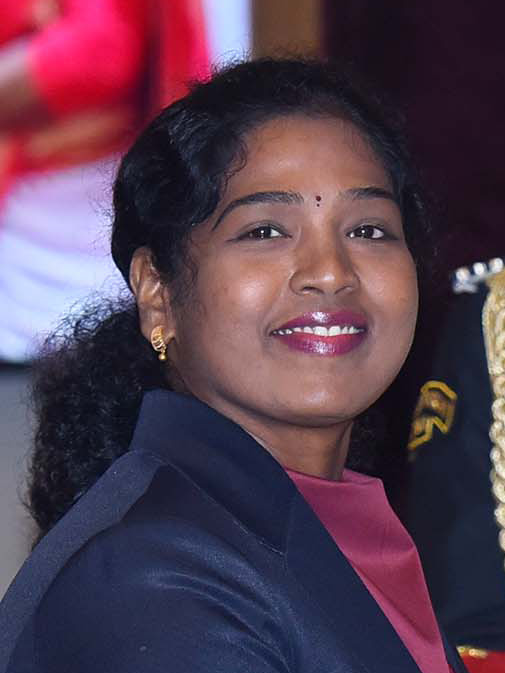

Medal record

Representing India

Women's Kabaddi

Asian Games
Gold medal – first place	2010 Guangzhou	Team

Kavitha Selvaraj is an Indian kabaddi player. She was a member of the team that won a gold medal at the 2010 Asian games in Guangzhou.
