= Zobera Rahman Linu =

Bangladeshi table tennis player

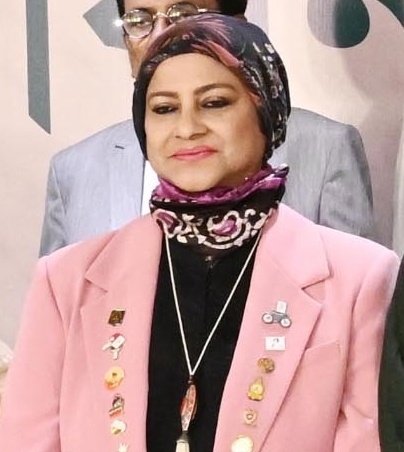
- Linu in 2026

Personal information
- Native name: জোবেরা রহমান লিনু
- Nationality: Bangladeshi
- Born: 9 June 1965 (age 61) Kaptai, Rangamati District, Bangladesh

Sport
- Sport: Table tennis
- Playing style: Shakehand, all-round attack

Zobera Rahman Linu is a Bangladeshi table tennis player. She won a record 16 national championships during 1979–2001. She is the recipient of Bangladesh National Sports Award (1999) in the table tennis category. In 2026, she was awarded Independence Award, the highest civilian honour of Bangladesh.

== Early life and education ==
Linu grew up in Sylhet at Shahzibazar. She passed SSC from Rosulpur school of Narsingdi District. She completed her HSC and BA from Lalmatia Girls College in Dhaka. She later earned her master's in psychology from Jagannath College.

== Career ==
Linu started playing when she was 8 years old. In 1977, she won the championships in singles, doubles and mixed doubles. She won 16 national championships during 1979–2001. She stood 5th in 1980's Asian Table Tennis Championship which took place in Japan.

Linu participated at the World Table Tennis Championships in 1977 and 2000.

Linu served as the Goodwill Ambassador for UNICEF in Bangladesh.
