= Smita Kumari =

Indian kabaddi player

Medal record

Representing India

Women's Kabaddi

Asian Games
Gold medal – first place	2010 Guangzhou	Team

Smita Kumari a kabaddi player from India. She was a member of the team that won a gold medal at the 2010 Asian games in Guangzhou.
