= Sanahanbi Devi =

Indian kabaddi player

Medal record

Representing India

Women's Kabaddi

Asian Games
Gold medal – first place	2010 Guangzhou	Team

Sanahanbi Devi Kangabam is an Indian kabaddi player. She was a member of the team that won the kabaddi gold medal in the 2010 Asian games in Guangzhou.
