= Rituraj Bhowmick =

Bangladeshi singer and author

- ঋতুরাজ ভৌমিক
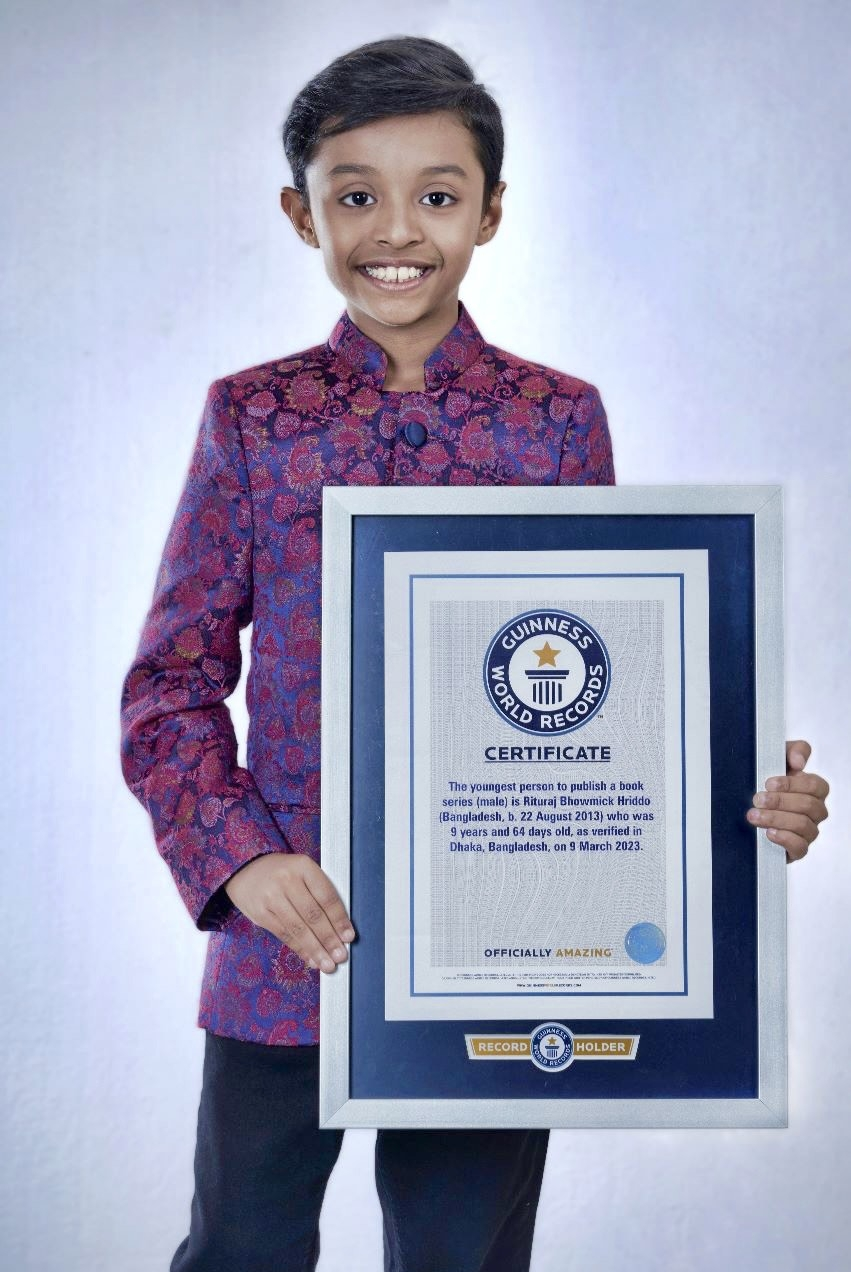
- Rituraj Bhowmick Hriddo with his certificate of Guinness World Records
- Born: Rituraj Bhowmick Hriddo; August 22, 2013 (age 13); Dhaka, Bangladesh
- Citizenship: Bangladesh
- Occupations: Author; Singer
- Relatives: Shuvashish Bhowmick (Father)
- Writing career
- Language: Bengali; English
- Years active: 2022–present
- Notable work: "Goodwill Factory" book series
- Notable awards: Guinness World Record; Diana Award
- Website: www.baapkabeta.co

Rituraj Bhowmick, (a.k.a.: Baap Ka Beta; born August 22, 2013) is a Bangladeshi author and singer.

== Biography ==
Rituraj Bhowmick was born on August 22, 2013. He lives in Dhaka, Bangladesh and studies at Australian International School. Bhowmick's father, Shuvashish Bhowmick also sings and supports his son's career. Rituraj Bhowmick gained popularity by singing and sharing videos on social media with his father's support. Bhowmick can play guitar and had a keen interest in modern-day band songs from an early age.

In 2019, his cover of Tahsan Rahman Khan's song went viral, leading to a mass number of followers on their Facebook page and YouTube channel, Baap Ka Beta. Bhowmick caught the attention of a telecom company, resulting in his first TV appearance on January 11, 2020. Bhowmick aspires to be an army officer like his grandfather and enjoys playing cricket.

== Popularity and awards ==
Bhowmick's career began with internet fame as part of the band Baap Ka Beta. Rituraj's passion for writing peaked during the COVID-19 pandemic in Bangladesh, leading to the publication of his first book Goodwill Factory in 2022 at the age of 9. Bhowmick is a recipient of the Rokomari Bestseller Award.

Later, Bhowmick published a sequel to his book Goodwill Factory 2. He currently holds the Guinness World Record for being the youngest person to publish the book series in 2023.

In addition, Rituraj Bhowmik was honored with the Diana Award in 2023 at the age of 9 for his dedication to empowering underprivileged children in Bangladesh through educational initiatives, donation drives, and authoring books with proceeds solely dedicated to their education.
