= Omar Ishrak =

Bangladeshi-American businessman

Omar S Ishrak
- ওমর ইশরাক
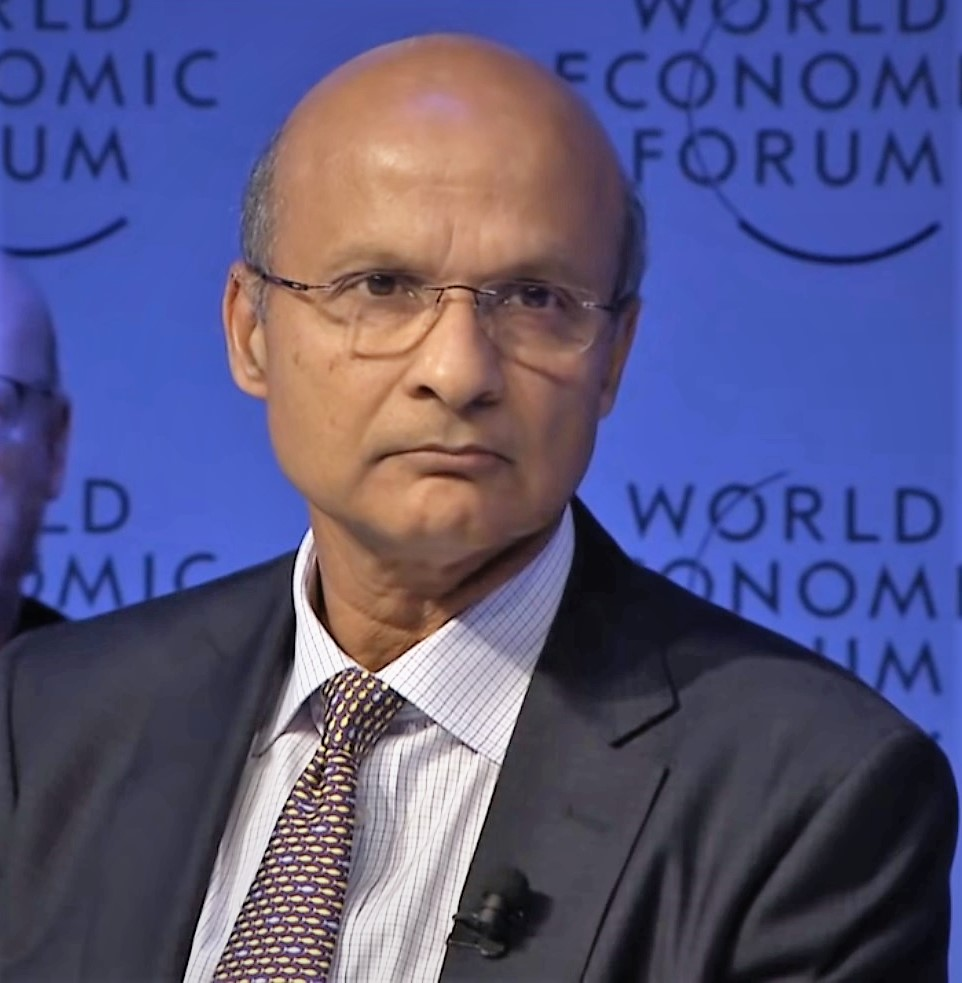
- Ishrak at the World Economic Forum in 2017
- Born: Omar Ishrak; 1955 (age 70–71); Dhaka, Bangladesh
- Education: St Joseph Higher Secondary School, Dhaka
- Alma mater: King's College London, University of London (BS, PhD)
- Occupations: investor; entrepreneur
- Title: Executive chairman and chairman of the board, Medtronic; chairman of the board, intel Chairman Qubit Health Capital

Omar S. Ishrak (born 1955) is a Bangladeshi-American business executive, serving as the chairman of the board for Intel, since January 2020. He was previously the CEO and chairman of the board of Medtronic from June 2011 to April 2020, and remained as executive chairman and chairman of its board of directors until December 2020.

== Biography ==
Ishrak was born and raised in Dhaka, Bangladesh. He did his schooling at St. Joseph Higher Secondary School in Dhaka. He studied at King's College London and was awarded a Bachelor of Science in electrical engineering and a Doctor of Philosophy in electrical engineering from the University of London.

Before joining Medtronic, he served as the president and CEO of GE Healthcare Systems. He is currently Chairman of Qubit Health Capital.

Omar has been a member of the Intel board of directors since March 2017. He was announced the independent chairman of its board in January 2020.

In 2020, Ishrak was elected as a member of the National Academy of Engineering for "contributions to diagnostic ultrasound and for leadership in medical technology innovation and globalization." In 2021 he joined Amgen's board of directors.

== Personal life ==
He is married, and lives in Minneapolis.
