= Upay =

UCB Fintech Company Limited
- Native name: উপায়
- Type: Private company
- Founded: 2021
- Headquarters: Dhaka, Bangladesh
- Services: Money transfer
- Website: upaybd.com

Upay is the digital financial services brand of UCB Fintech Company Limited, a subsidiary of United Commercial Bank PLC. After securing a license from Bangladesh Bank, Upay officially launched its operations in early 2021. Upay provides extensive services across all 64 districts of Bangladesh. Upay's products and services include mobile money transfers, utility bill payments, in-store and e-commerce payments, remittance collection, salary disbursements, government allowance distribution, mobile recharge, traffic fine payments, Indian visa fee payments, and various other value-added services.

== Banking App ==
Like other mobile banking services in Bangladesh, Upay mobile banking has its own application, through which customers can create a Upay account by providing their personal information.

== Mobile Banking Features ==
- Send Money allows easy financial transactions through Upay mobile banking.
- Mobile recharge can be done through Upay mobile banking.
- Customers can cash out their funds using Upay mobile banking.
- Various bill payments can be made using Upay mobile banking services, such as electricity bills, gas bills, water bills, telephone bills, internet bills, etc.
- Savings can be maintained through this mobile banking service.

== See Also ==
- Rocket
- PayTaka
- bKash
- Nagad
- Mobile banking
