= Khaled Muhiuddin =

Bangladeshi journalist (born 1974)

- খালেদ মুহিউদ্দীন
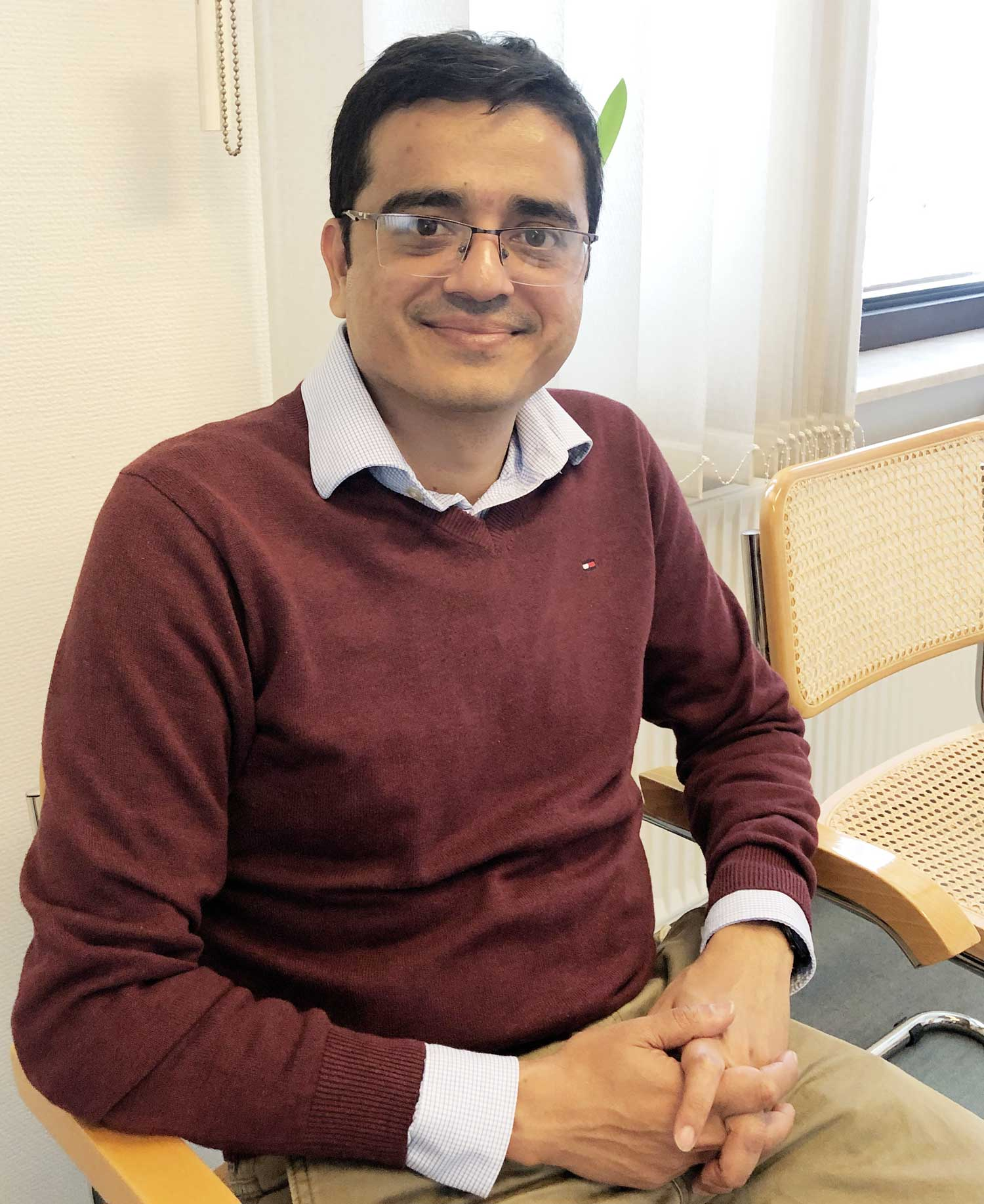
- Muhiuddin in 2019
- Born: 16 September 1974 (age 51); Dhaka, Bangladesh
- Education: Dhaka University Government Science College, Dhaka
- Occupations: Journalist, writer
- Spouse: Farhana Shawon

Khaled Muhiuddin (Bengali: খালেদ মুহিউদ্দীন) is a Bangladeshi journalist, talk show presenter and writer. He is recognized as the former presenter of the talk show Ajker Bangladesh on Independent Television. Mohiuddin has also served as the head of Bengali department of Deutsche Welle He is currently associated with Thikana News.

== Early life ==
Khaled was born on 16 September 1974 in Dhaka, Bangladesh. His ancestral home is in Comilla. On February 2, 2001, he married Farhana Shawn, an officer at IFIC Bank. While working in the Media of Bangladesh, he resided in Mirpur, Dhaka, with his wife and daughter.

== Education ==
Muhiuddin completed his graduate studies in the Department of Mass Communication and Journalism at the University of Dhaka. He has been engaged in part-time teaching at the same department and has also served as a part-time lecturer at Jahangirnagar University. In 2003–2004, he obtained a Master of Arts degree from Westminster University in the United Kingdom.

== Career ==
Khaled Muhiuddin began his career in journalism but briefly held the position of magistrate after passing the Bangladesh Civil Service (20th BCS) examination under the Bangladesh Public Service Commission. He worked as the city page editor and senior reporter at Prothom Alo, covering legal affairs and mineral resources. Additionally, he was involved in planning and editing Dhakai Thaki.

Muhiuddin served as the news editor at the online newspaper and private news agency Bdnews24.com for a period. He later joined Independent Television, a private television channel in Bangladesh, where he worked as an executive producer for seven years. He also hosted the talk show Ajker Bangladesh on the same channel.

In 2006, he participated in the International Visitor Leadership Program in the United States as part of a delegation of Bangladeshi journalists. From 2008 to 2009, he worked as a consultant for the World Bank. In 2011, he joined Independent Television.

In 2019, Muhiuddin was appointed head of the Bengali department at Deutsche Welle, a German-based international media organization. In 2024, he joined the U.S.-based Thikana News.

== Published books ==
Khaled Muhiuddin has authored nine books. Among them, Concept of Communication and Communication Theory, co-written with Professor ASM Asaduzzaman, are used as textbooks at the University of Dhaka and Barisal University. The books published are

- Communication Ideas
- Communication Theory
- Some of me
- A Millennium Previous Story
- One day of Aminullah'
- 1419 – Storybook
- human weakness
- Travelogue 'Tittha Moment'
- Control C Control V
