= Pooja Sharma (kabaddi) =

Indian kabaddi player

Medal record

Representing India

Women's Kabaddi

Asian Games
Gold medal – first place	2010 Guangzhou	Team

Pooja Sharma born 15 December 1984 is a kabaddi player from India. She was a member of the kabaddi team that won a gold medal in the 2010 Asian games in Guangzhou.
