= Kochi Rani Mondal =

Bangladeshi kabaddi player

Medal record

Representing Bangladesh

Women's Kabaddi

Asian Games
Bronze medal – third place	2010 Guangzhou	Team

Kochi Rani Mondal (Bengali: কচি রানী মন্ডল) is a Bangladeshi national women's Kabaddi player who was part of the team that won the bronze medal at the 2010 Asian Games.
