= Hena Akhter =

Bangladeshi kabaddi player

Medal record

Representing Bangladesh

Women's Kabaddi

Asian Games
Bronze medal – third place	2010 Guangzhou	Team

Hena Akhter (Bengali: হেনা আক্তার) is a Bangladeshi national women Kabaddi player who was part of the team that won the bronze medal at the 2010 Asian Games.
