= Deepika Joseph =

Indian kabaddi player

Deepika Meena Joseph is an Indian professional international kabaddi player. She was a member of the team that won a gold medal at the 2010 Asian games in Guangzhou.

Deepika represented team India For the first time in the 2007 Asian championship when she was 16 years old.

She played SAF Games 2010 in Bangladesh (gold medal), Indoor Asian games 2013 Korea (gold medal). Currently playing for the country as a vice captain; won SAF games 2019 in Nepal.

== Early life ==
Deepika was raised by her mother Mrs Meena Joseph single-handedly.

== Career ==
She was the vice captain of 1st at the Women's world cup winning team in (Patna) Bihar.

Deepika represented team India in 2013 for the indoor Asian games and played SAF games in 2010 where she won a gold medal. Deepika played SAF games 2019 in Nepal Kathmandu and won the gold medal.

Deepika suffered many injuries, financial instability but still made a comeback.
