= Nikhilesh Dutta =

Bangladeshi barrister

Sir Nikhilesh Dutta
- Born: January 5, 1939 (age 87)
- Education: University of Dhaka

Sir Nikhilesh Dutta (born January 5, 1939) is a Bangladeshi barrister who was called to the Bar as a Member of the Honourable Society of the Inner Temple, London, England. For his contribution in promoting inter-religious harmony, he was conferred with a knighthood as a Knight Bachelor by Queen Elizabeth II in 2007. Dutta, with a legal practice in the Supreme Court of Bangladesh, was the first national who was called to the Bar as a barrister on 8 February 1972 from independent Bangladesh.

== Career ==
Dutta was born into a Hindu Zamindar family in 1939. After his master's in political science from Dacca University (presently known as Dhaka University), he studied public administration in post graduation from School of Oriental and African Studies, University of London. Later on he received his Barrister-at-Law degree from the Inner Temple.

Dutta started his career in the early 1970s and became one of the prominent leading advocates of the Supreme Court of Bangladesh. He also held the post of the Deputy Attorney General for the Government of Bangladesh for 11 years. His areas of practice and experience include both civil and criminal matters. Though he started his career as a criminal litigant lawyer, Dutta chose to switch to civil practice, which includes constitutional law practice too. One of the special areas of practice that Dutta possesses is that even though he is a Hindu by birth, Dutta has experience in Islamic law.

Dutta has also acted as a Special Advisor for Abhay (Gandhi) Ashram based in Comilla, Bangladesh, and solved complex situations of the Ashram.

In his career as a barrister, Dutta has also been involved with many charitable organizations. As a managing trustee of Mahesh Charitable Organisation, he has been handling various legal matters.

== Chambers ==
Dutta heads the chambers of Dutta & Bhadra, which carries a legacy and has a tradition in advocacy and soliciting for more than a hundred years. JDS Lawchambers, which is a full-service law firm providing advocacy and services has a family alliance with Chambers of Dutta & Bhadra.
