= Saad Z. Hossain =

Bangladeshi author

Saad Z. Hossain, born April 22, 1979, in Dhaka, Bangladesh, is a Bangladeshi author writing in English. He lives in Dhaka.

His war satire, Escape from Baghdad!, was published in 2015 by Unnamed Press in the US, and Aleph in India. It was translated into French by Agullo Editions, as Bagdad la Grande Evasion. This book was a finalist for the Grand Prix de L'imaginaire 2018.

His second book, Djinn City, was released in 2017 by Unnamed Press, Aleph Book Company, and Bengal Lights Publications. It was also published in French by Agullo Editions in October 2020, translated by Jean Francois Le Ruyet, who subsequently won the 2021 Grand Prix de L'imaginaire for his work on the book.

His third book, The Gurkha and the Lord of Tuesday, was published in summer 2019 by Tor.com. It has received critical acclaim and was a finalist for the Locus Awards as well as the IGNYTE Awards 2020 by Fiyahcon.

His fourth book, Cyber Mage, was published in 2021 by Unnamed Press in the US, and ULAB Press, in Bangladesh. It is a sequel to Djinn City and Gurkha, set in Dhaka, some years in the future.

His fifth book, Kundo Wakes Up, was published in 2022 by Tor.com. It was on the Locus reading list of best novellas for 2022, and was on the longlist for the British Science Fiction Association awards.

He was named a 2024 Fall Fellow of the University of Iowa International Writing Program in Iowa City, Iowa.

== Reviews of his work ==
His books have received generally positive reviews, and were included in some year end lists, including Financial Times Books of the year 2015 and Tor Reviewers Choice for 2015.

A marvelous mix of genres, blending the visceral atmosphere of a war movie with the casual nihilism of Catch-22 or the original M.A.S.H. complete with an Indiana Jones–style treasure quest to employ a mystical watch that doesn't tell time to unleash the ancient power of the Druze before the sect's ancient Alchemist, the real enemy, catches up with them ... A gonzo adventure novel that shreds the conventional wisdom that pulp can be pigeonholed." -Kirkus Reviews

Saad Hossain has given us a hilarious and searing indictment of the project we euphemistically call 'nation-building.' With nods to Catch-22, Frankenstein, The Island of Doctor Moreau and the Golem myth, Escape from Baghdad! weaves fantasy, absurdity and adventure into a moving counter-narrative to the myth of the just war. —Daniel José Older, NPR

Saad Hossain is the author of Escape from Baghdad!, an engrossing cross between Zero Dark Thirty and Raiders of the Lost Ark that takes a sobering look at America's troubled legacy in Iraq. It's easily one of the best (and strangest, and most badass) books I've read in 2015. -Bookslut

Saad Hossain's perplexingly weird debut novel, Escape From Baghdad!, captures the pure insanity of the Iraq War. At the same time, it's not a war novel. Instead, it's a skillfully constructed literary IED that brings together the sharpest aspects from multiple genres. It's a Tarantino-esque Heart of Darkness set in war-torn Iraq, filled with absurdism and dark humor, a mash-up of satirical Joseph Heller-style comedy and sci-fi fantasy with a gratuitous mixture of good old-fashioned ultra-violence. -Colby Buzzell, Vice

Whatever your level of familiarity with beings mythological and godlike, rest assured: you've never journeyed with djinn like these before! Saad Z. Hossain's Djinn City is a wholly enchanting contemporary fantasy novel that takes cherished stories of fantastical beings and transforms them into something crisp, engrossing, and newly relevant. -Foreword Review

That Hossain is a master storyteller is evident from the pace and the tone of the book. He switches from the tragic to the funny with marvellous ease. And when you are done reading the book, there's more on offer – "a glossary of absolutely 100 percent factual things meticulously researched by the author during his lunch break". -Lamat R Hasan, Hindustan Times

I loved this book; it's full of strange places, even stranger characters, and enough plot twists to knit with. The characters you hate at the start turn out to be more complex; the characters you love all have darker sides, and for most, you're never quite sure where you – or they – stand. -SFF World

Pas de roman plus improbable que Bagdad, la grande évasion !, le premier d'un auteur bangladais, Saad Z. Hossain. Improbable, il l'est avec naturel et fantaisie. Disons que son récit mixe des scènes ultraviolentes et des digressions mâtinées de philosophie ou d'humour noir; une expédition punitive en « Kevlar de location » et un largage de mots d'amour par hélico, lors d'une offensive à l'arme lourde. -Macha Sery, Le Monde

== Bibliography ==
=== Novels and novellas ===
- Escape from Baghdad!, Unnamed Press, 2015 (originally published Baghdad Immortals, Bengal Publications, 2013)
- Djinn City, Unnamed Press, 2017
- The Gurkha and the Lord of Tuesday, Tor.com, 2019
- Cyber Mage, Unnamed Press, 2021
- Kundo Wakes Up, Tor.com, 2022

=== Short stories in anthologies ===
- The Apex Book of World SF: Volume 4, Apex Publications, 2015
- The Djinn Falls in Love and Other Stories, Solaris, 2017;
- The Best Science Fiction & Fantasy of the Year: Volume 12, Solaris, 2018
- Made to Order: Robots and Revolutions, Solaris, 2020
- The Big book of Cyberpunk, Vintage, 2023
- New Suns 2 Original Speculative Fiction by People of Color, Solaris, 2023
- The Book of Witches, Harper Voyager, 2023
- The Hachette Book of Indian Detective Fiction Volumes I and II, Hachette, 2024
- Tomorrow's Parties Life in the Anthropocene, MIT Press, 2022
