= Bangabandhu Cup 2023 =

Bangabandhu Cup 2023 বঙ্গবন্ধু কাপ ২০২৩
Tournament information
- Dates: 13–21 March 2023
- Format: Standard style
- Tournament format(s): Single Round-robin and Knockout
- Host: Bangladesh
- Venue(s): Shaheed Noor Hossain National Volleyball Stadium, Paltan, Dhaka
- Participants: 12

Final positions
- Champions: Bangladesh (3rd Titles)
- 1st runners-up: Chinese Taipei
- 2nd runners-up: Thailand; Iraq

Tournament statistics
- Matches played: 33
- Best Raider: (Bangladesh) Mijanur Rahman
- Best Catcher: (Bangladesh) Tuhin Tarafder
- Player of the Tournament: (Bangladesh) Mijanur Rahman

The Bangabandhu Cup 2023 is an International Kabaddi Tournament organised by Bangladesh Kabaddi Federation in Bangladesh. The third season of Bangabandhu Cup this tournament will be commenced from 13 to 21 March 2023. The event will take place in Dhaka, Bangladesh. A total of 12 teams across several continents (Asia, Europe, Africa, and South America) are set to participate in the Bangabandu Kabaddi Cup.

Bangladesh are the previous champions of the Bangabandhu Cup. They won the title for the 2nd time in 2022, defeating Kenya in the final.

== Participating nations ==
No.	Team	Apps.
1	Bangladesh (Host)	3rd
2	Argentina	1st
3	Chinese Taipei	1st
4	England	2nd
5	Iraq	2nd
6	Indonesia	2nd
7	Malaysia	2nd
8	Nepal	3rd
9	Kenya	3rd
10	Poland	2nd
11	Thailand	1st
12	Sri Lanka	3rd

== Venues ==
The all games were played at the following venues. Shaheed Noor Hossain National Volleyball Stadium, Paltan, Dhaka.

Dhaka	Dhaka is located in Bangladesh
Shaheed Noor Hossain National Volleyball Stadium	Dhaka is located in Bangladesh
Capacity: 5,000	Dhaka is located in Bangladesh

== Group stage ==
Group A	Group B
Bangladesh(H); Argentina; Poland Iraq; England; Nepal	Chinese Taipei; Indonesia; Kenya Sri Lanka; Thailand; Malaysia

Key to colours in group tables
Group winners & runners-ups teams will advance to the Knockout-stage.

=== Group A ===
Pos	Team	Pld	W	L	T	SD	Pts	
1	Bangladesh (H)	5	5	0	0	139	10	Qualification to semi finals
2	Iraq	5	4	1	0	29	8	Qualification to semi finals
3	Nepal	5	3	2	0	46	6	
4	England	5	2	3	0	-47	4	
5	Poland	5	1	4	0	28	2	
6	Argentina	5	0	5	0	-167	0	

Source: BC23
(H) Host

13 March 2023
16:30

Bangladesh	50–22	Poland
	Match 1

13 March 2023
17:30

Iraq	56–28	Argentina
	Match 3

14 March 2023
17:00

Bangladesh	72–23	Argentina
	Match 6

14 March 2023
18:00

Iraq	49–48	Nepal
	Match 7

14 March 2023
17:00

England	38–35	Poland
	Match 8

15 March 2023
15:00

Nepal	39–24	England
	Match 9

15 March 2023
16:00

Iraq	38–31	Poland
	Match 10

16 March 2023
16:00

Bangladesh	40–24	Nepal
	Match 16

17 March 2023
14:00

Bangladesh	55–27	England
	Match 18

17 March 2023
16:00

Argentina	28–62	Nepal
	March 20

18 March 2023
16:00

Bangladesh	49–33	Iraq
	Match 24

18 March 2023
17:00

England	41–37	Argentina
	March 25

18 March 2023
18:00

Nepal	49–35	Poland
	Match 26

19 March 2023
15:00

Iraq	47–36	England
	Match 27

19 March 2023
16:00

Poland	86–34	Argentina
	Match 28

=== Group B ===
Pos	Team	Pld	W	L	T	SD	Pts	
1	Chinese Taipei	5	4	1	0	76	8	Qualification to semi finals
2	Thailand	5	4	1	0	61	8	Qualification to semi finals
3	Kenya	5	3	2	0	61	6	
4	Sri Lanka	5	3	2	0	37	6	
5	Indonesia	5	1	4	0	-90	2	
6	Malaysia	5	0	5	0	-167	0	

Source: BC23

13 March 2023
18:30

Kenya	40–45	Chinese Taipei
	Match 2

14 March 2023
15:00

Malaysia	23–36	Indonesia
	Match 4

14 March 2023
16:00

Sri Lanka	32–36	Thailand
	Match 5

15 March 2023
17:00

Kenya	42–47	Thailand
	Match 11

15 March 2023
18:00

Indonesia	22–38	Chinese Taipei
	Match 12

15 March 2023
19:00

Sri Lanka	45–26	Malaysia
	Match 13

16 March 2023
14:00

Malaysia	24–59	Thailand
	Match 14

16 March 2023
15:00

Kenya	65–33	Indonesia
	[Match 15]

16 March 2023
17:00

Sri Lanka	41–39	Chinese Taipei
	Match 17

17 March 2023
15:00

Kenya	81–26	Malaysia
	Match 19

17 March 2023
17:00

Thailand	28–40	Chinese Taipei
	March 21

17 March 2023
18:00

Sri Lanka	47–21	Indonesia
	Match 22

18 March 2023
15:00

Malaysia	34–79	Chinese Taipei
	Match 23

19 March 2023
17:00

Indonesia	26–55	Thailand
	Match 29

19 March 2023
18:00

Kenya	40–34	Sri Lanka
	Match 30

== Knockout stage ==
Semi-finals
A1	Bangladesh	45
B2	Thailand	26
B1	Chinese Taipei	52
A2	Iraq	44

Final
SF1	Bangladesh	42
SF2	Chinese Taipei	28

=== Semi-Finals ===
20 March 2023
17:00

Bangladesh	45–26	Thailand
	SF 1

20 March 2023
18:00

Chinese Taipei	52–44	Iraq
	SF 2

=== Final ===
21 March 2023
17:00

Bangladesh	42–28	Chinese Taipei
	Final Match

== Broadcasting ==
T Sports served as host broadcaster of the tournament. And, Bangladesh Kabaddi Federation will broadcast all matches on YouTube & Facebook .

Television

Countries	TV	Streaming
Bangladesh	T Sports	Toffee
