= Scotland national kabaddi team =

Scotland
- Nickname(s): They Shall be Kicked
- Association: Kabaddi Scotland
- Confederation: International Kabaddi Federation (IKF)
- Head Coach: Sukhinder Dhillon
- Captain: Junayd Javid
- Most caps: Junayd Javid

World Cup
- 0

Kabaddi World Cup
- 1 (first in 2025)
- (bronze) 3rd (2025)

European Championship
- 1 (first in 2019)
- 3rd (2019)
Medal record
Event	1st	2nd	3rd
Kabaddi World Cup	0	0	1
European Championship	0	0	1
Total	0	0	2

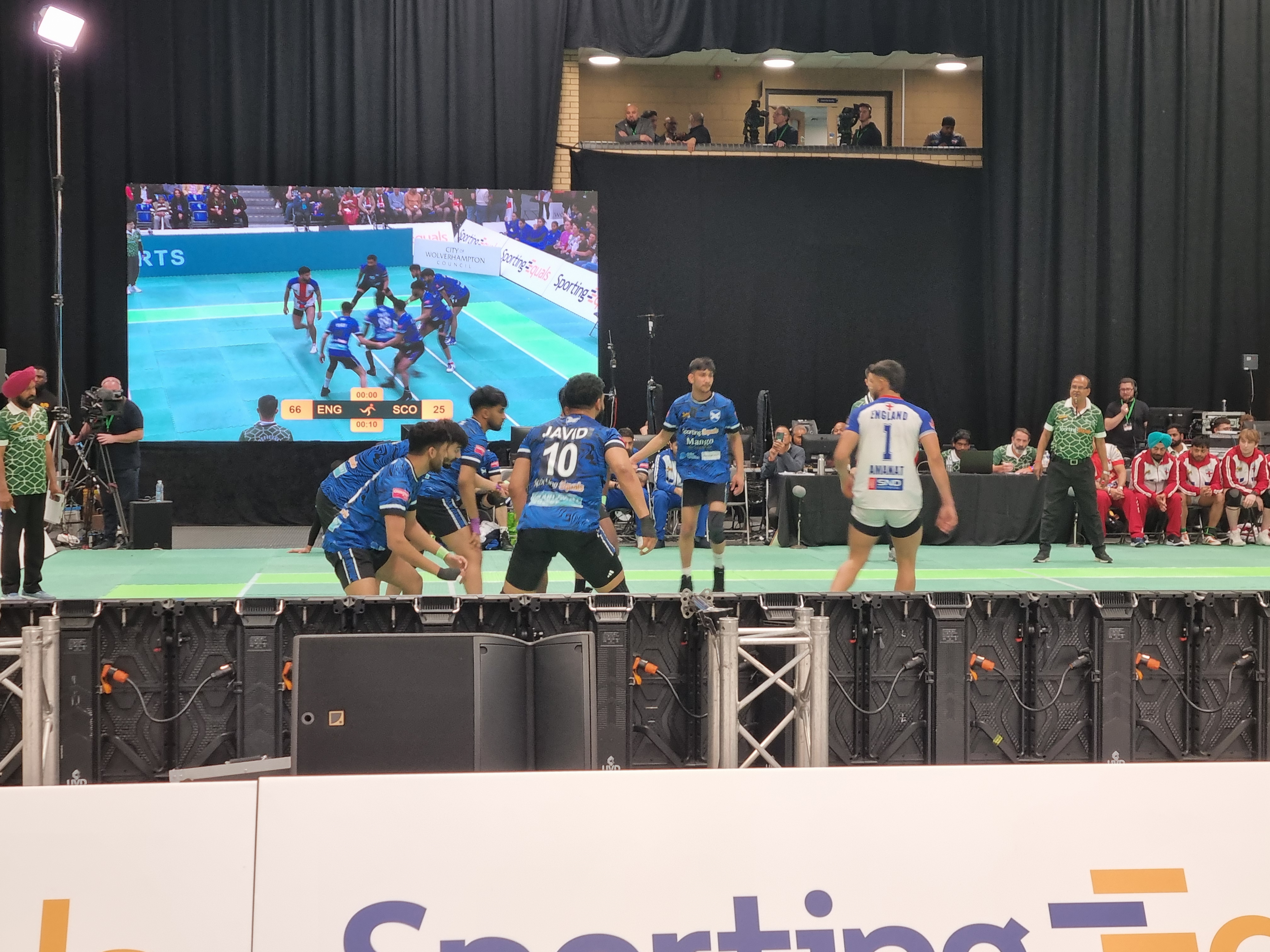
Scottish national team at the 2025 Kabaddi World Cup (World Kabaddi).

The Scotland national kabaddi team was established in 2012, and represents the country in the National Kabaddi Association. It participated in the 2012 Kabaddi World Cup with a team including some rugby players from the University of Strathclyde, losing all three group matches.

In 2019, Scotland hosted the European Championships for the first time in their history where the Scotland kabaddi team got to the Semi Finals and were put out by Poland who went on to win the 2019 European Championships.

== Tournament history ==
=== Standard kabaddi ===
==== World Cup (IKF) ====
World Cup
Year	Rank	M	W	D	L	PF	PA	PD
(India) 2004	Didn’t Participate							
(India) 2007	Didn’t Participate							
(India) 2016	Didn’t Participate							
(India) 2025	TBD							
Total	–	5	2	0	3	137	155	−18

==== World Cup (World Kabaddi) ====
Kabaddi World Cup
Year	Rank	M	W	D	L	PF	PA	PD
(Malaysia) 2019	Didn’t participate							
(England) 2025	Third place	7	5	2	1	140	115	+25
Total	–	7	5	2	1	140	115	+25

==== European Kabaddi Championship ====
European Kabaddi Championship
Year	Rank	M	W	D	L	PF	PA	PD
(Scotland) 2019	Third place	5	3	2	0	134	99	+35
(Cyprus) 2021	Didn’t Participate							
(Italy) 2023	Didn’t Participate							
Total	1/3	5	3	2	0	134	99	+35

== Current squad ==
No	Player	Role
1	Junayd Javid (Captain)	All-rounder
2	Ryan McGallagly	All-rounder
3	Suraj Johal	All-rounder
4	Jai Patel	All-rounder
5	Dilux Nagenthiram	All-rounder
6	Surya Muthu	All-rounder
7	Tayyib Majumder	All-rounder
8	Vijay Chahal	All-rounder
9	Ranjit Singh	Raider
10	Jinson Raju	Raider
11	Pargat Singh	Raider
12	Dushyant Kadian	Raider
13	Jashanpreet Singh	Raider

== Coaching staff ==
Position	Name
Head coach	(England) Sukhinder 'Skip' Dhillon
Team manager	vacant

== International grounds ==
Locations of stadiums which have hosted international kabaddi matches in Scotland

Stadium	City	Region	Capacity	Matches hosted	Notes
Emirates Arena	Glasgow	Scotland	6,000	European Kabaddi Championship, exhibition matches	One of the largest indoor venues in Scotland; hosted international kabaddi fixtures
Oriam	Edinburgh	Scotland	500	National team training, friendly matches	Scotland’s national sports training center; used for kabaddi camps and indoor matches
