= England national kabaddi team =

English sports team

England
- Association: England Kabaddi Association (EKA), England Kabaddi Union (EKU)
- Confederation: International Kabaddi Federation, World Kabaddi, World Kabaddi Federation

For the sport, Kabaddi (Rectangle) in England, there are multiple national governing bodies which field their own respective England National Kabaddi Team. The two main governing bodies are England Kabaddi Association (EKA) and England Kabaddi Union (EKU).

== Governance ==
=== England Kabaddi Association (EKA) ===
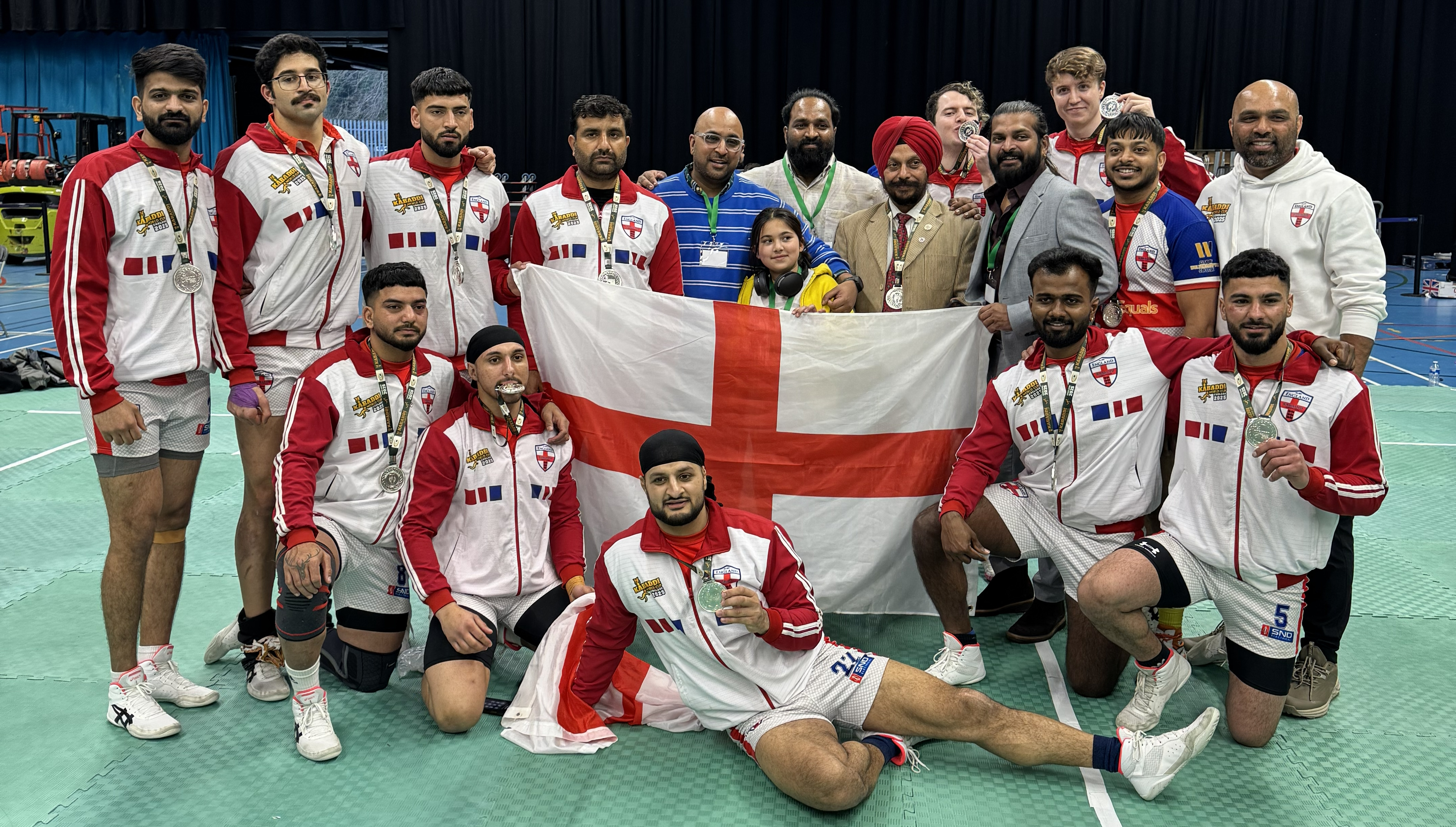
Men's team at the 2025 World Cup.

The England Kabaddi Association (EKA) was established in 2003–2004 by Ashok Das. The England team was affiliated with the International Kabaddi Federation during the 2000s and early 2010s and subsequently with World Kabaddi and World Kabaddi Federation.

In the inaugural 2004 Kabaddi World Cup in Mumbai, the team reached the quarter-finals, where they lost to Canada.

The England team also participated in the 2016 Kabaddi World Cup in India while affiliated with the International Kabaddi Federation.

In 2016, the England Kabaddi Association helped facilitate the participation of England player Philip Mottram in the Pro Kabaddi League, where he was selected by Bengaluru Bulls.

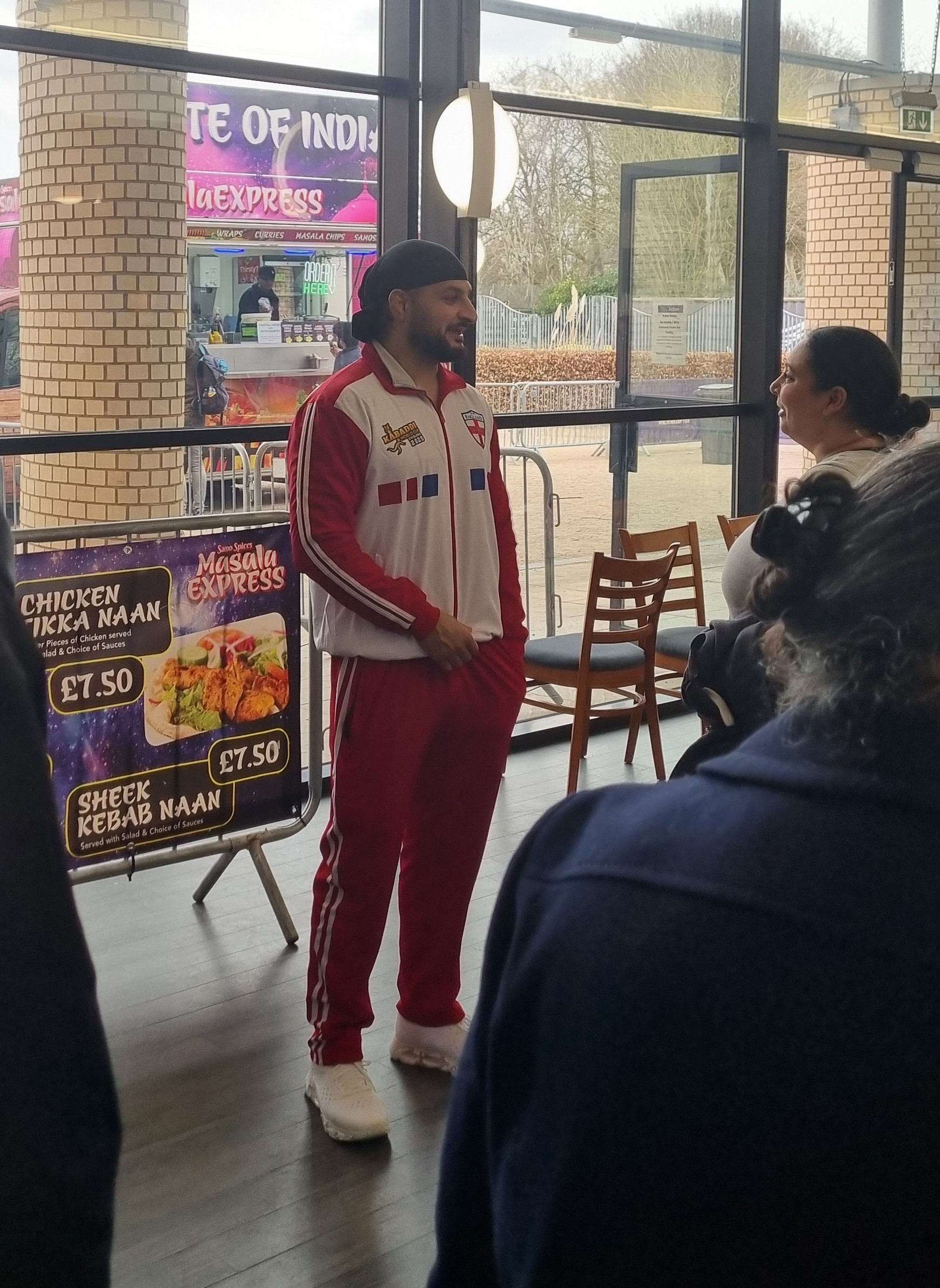
Hardeep (Harry) Singh, English national team captain, at the 2025 Kabaddi World Cup (World Kabaddi).

From 2022 to 2024, the England Kabaddi Association and the Scottish Kabaddi Association jointly organised the British Kabaddi League. The league featured teams from across England and Scotland and was broadcast on BBC Sport. Birmingham Bulls won the first two seasons, while Glasgow Unicorns won the 2024 season.

The England Kabaddi Association also organises domestic competitions, including the England Nationals 2025 and the England Pro Kabaddi League (EPKL).

In the 2025 Kabaddi World Cup, hosted in England, the team reached the final and won a silver medal, losing to India.

The England Kabaddi Association has participated in European Kabaddi Championships, including tournaments held in Italy and Cyprus.

Outside Kabaddi (Rectangle), the England Kabaddi Association has also fielded teams in other kabaddi formats, including Circle Kabaddi.

=== England Kabaddi Union (EKU) ===
The England Kabaddi Union (EKU) was formed in 2019 and is affiliated with the International Kabaddi Federation and EuroKabaddi.

The England Kabaddi Union (EKU) compiled and produced the UK's first standardised set of rules, which were endorsed by the England Kabaddi Federation UK for Rectangle style Kabaddi as the "official rules governing Rectangle Kabaddi in the UK". The rules are not universally used within the UK, with some organisations using their own rulesets.

The EuroKabaddi rules for Rectangle Kabaddi were drafted by Karmanya Singh and Sanjay Patel, the vice-president and president, respectively, of the England Kabaddi Union.

In 2021, the England Kabaddi Union worked with the Department for Culture, Media and Sport (DCMS) of the UK Government to bring back Kabaddi following the COVID-19 pandemic with government-approved Return-To-Play guidance.

The England Kabaddi Union is affiliated with Kabaddi clubs at universities across England including Imperial College London, King's College London, London School of Economics, University of Cambridge, University of Manchester and Warwick University which provide the grassroots system and player pool for England Kabaddi Union’s National Kabaddi Team.

The England Kabaddi Union operates a three-tier referee certification programme and a national coaching certification programme for kabaddi coaches.

In 2023, the England Kabaddi Union entered Felix Li and Yuvraj Pandeya into the Pro Kabaddi League Season 10 auction, where both players were acquired by Dabang Delhi KC for INR 13,00,000 each. Both players were part of the team's squad during the season.

The England Kabaddi Union has also partnered with World Kabaddi for running collaborative training sessions across England and Scotland with Kabaddi Scotland.

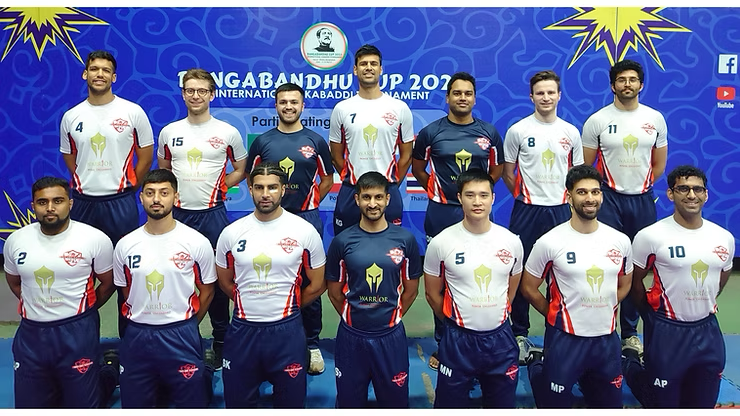
EKU England Men's team at the Bangabandhu Cup 2023

In 2022, the EKU England team made their debut at the Bangabandhu Cup in Dhaka, Bangladesh, losing all three of their matches against Bangladesh, Sri Lanka and Malaysia, finishing in the group stage. In the 2023 tournament, England defeated Poland and Argentina but lost to Bangladesh, Iraq and Nepal, finishing fourth in their group.

In 2026, the England Kabaddi Union led England's participation in the inaugural EuroKabaddi 3v3 Championship, which England won after defeating Poland in the final. England is also scheduled to participate in the EuroKabaddi Beach Kabaddi Championship later in 2026.

== Tournament history ==
=== World Cup ===
==== International Kabaddi Federation ====
	World Cup (IKF)								
Org	Year	Rank	M	W	D	L	PF	PA	PD
EKA	(India) 2004	Quarter-finals	4	2	0	2	170	208	-38
	(India) 2007								
EKA	(India) 2016	Group stage	5	2	0	3	137	155	−18
	Total	3/3	9	4	0	5	307	363	−56

==== World Kabaddi ====
	Kabaddi World Cup (World Kabaddi)								
Org	Year	Rank	M	W	D	L	PF	PA	PD
	(Malaysia) 2019	Didn’t Participate							
EKA	(England) 2025	Runners‑up	6	5	0	1	463	182	+281
	Total	1/2	6	5	0	1	463	182	+281

=== European Tournaments ===
==== European Kabaddi Championship (European Kabaddi Federation) ====
	European Kabaddi Championship (European Kabaddi Federation)								
Org	Year	Rank	M	W	D	L	PF	PA	PD
	(Scotland) 2019	Didn’t Participate							
EKA	(Cyprus) 2021	Group stage	4	2	0	2	122	95	+27
EKA	(Italy) 2023	Champion	4	3	0	1	129	101	+28
EKA	(Italy) 2024	Runners‑up	4	3	0	1	-	-	-
EKA	(Italy) 2025	Champion	-	-	-	-	-	-	-

==== 3V3 (EuroKabaddi) ====
	EuroKabaddi 3v3 championships (EuroKabaddi)								
Org	Year	Rank	M	W	D	L	PF	PA	PD
EKU	(Poland) 2026	Champion	5	4	0	1	-	-	-

=== Other international tournaments ===
==== Bangabandhu Cup ====
	Bangabandhu Cup - International Kabaddi Tournament								
Org	Year	Rank	M	W	D	L	PF	PA	PD
EKU	(Bangladesh) 2022	Group stage	3	0	0	3	67	127	-60
EKU	(Bangladesh) 2023	Group stage	5	2	0	3	166	213	-47

== Squad ==
Selected squads from recent international tournaments:

=== England Kabaddi Association (EKA) ===
==== World Cup 2025 ====
Men
No	Player	Role
1	Amanatpreet Singh	Raider
3	Abhijith Krishnan	Raider
4	John Dunlop	Raider
5	Jugraj Singh	All‑rounder
7	Jorawar Singh	Defender
8	Mandeep Singh	Left Corner
9	George Wellington	Raider
10	Ekom Singh	Raider
11	Sagar Doddaiah	Right Corner
12	Mashood Koorattante	All Rounder
14	Felix Li	Left Cover
22	Hardeep "Harry" Singh (Captain)	Right Cover
50	Shreyas Annadate	Raider
64	Alex Ogden	Raider

Women
No	Player	Role
1	Imane Sibhi	Raider
2	Emma Jones	Defender
3	Athira Sunil (Captain)	All rounder
4	Veerpal Kaur	Raider
5	Sophia Klair	Defender
6	Neelima Uni Suma	All rounder
7	Sally Hill	Defender
8	Georgia Sargent	Defender
9	Neeraja Uni Suma	All rounder
10	Pressymol Preni	Defender
11	Simarpreet Kaur	Defender
13	Sima Pacenkaite	Defender
23	Manpreet Kaur	Defender
30	Piraveena Sivanesalingham	Raider

=== England Kabaddi Union (EKU) ===
==== Bangabandhu Cup 2023 ====
Men
Player	Role
Someshwar Kalia (Captain)	All Rounder
Keshav Gupta (Vice Captain)	Raider
Ahilan Parthipan	Defender
Akul Purohit	Defender
Felix Li	Defender
Mahesh Popat	Defender
Philip Mottram	Raider
Shreyas Annadate	Raider
Tom Dawtrey	All Rounder
Vinay Gupta	All Rounder
Yuvraj Pandeya	Defender
Kishan Mistry	Coach

==== Beach Kabaddi 2024 ====
Men
Player	Role
George Wellington (Captain)	Raider
Taaher Kabir	All rounder
Haresh Ganenthiran	Defender
Milan Kaushal	Raider
Someshwar Kalia	All rounder
Shreyas Annadate	Raider
Mahesh Popat	Defender

Women
Player	Role
Hania Hussain (c)	Defender
Gunalini Gunendran	Defender
Aarna Sirohi	Raider
Malvika Pandey	All rounder
Anisa Khan	All rounder
Samreen Sabeer	Raider
Kaavya Guhan	Defender
Preeya Kaushal	Raider

== Coaching staff ==
=== England Kabaddi Union (EKU) ===
Position	Name
President (and Head Coach)	(England) Sanjay Patel
Vice President	(India) Karmanya Singh
Team Logistics and Operations Manager	(England) Kisan Sockalingam
