= Toffee (streaming service) =

Streaming service in Bangladesh

- Headquarters: Dhaka, Bangladesh
- Country of origin: Bangladesh
- Area served: Bangladesh
- Owner: Banglalink
- Industry: Broadcasting of sports events, streaming television
- Website: toffeelive.com
- Users: 10 million
- Launched: 5 November 2019
- Current status: Active

Toffee (Bengali: টফি) is a freemium media streaming service available in Bangladesh. Launched in 2019, it provides access to live as well as pre-recorded television channels and films. Toffee is owned by local telecommunications company Banglalink.

== Content ==
Toffee initially offered live local and foreign TV channels. Following the release of mobile applications on Google Play and the Apple App Store, the platform expanded to include sports, films, web series, and user-generated content. Toffee carries several Indian television programs, including channels owned by Sony Pictures Network India, Zee Entertainment Enterprises and Disney Star.

=== Language translation ===
Toffee has dubbed a number of Turkish drama series into Bangla, including Kuruluş: Osman, Diriliş: Ertuğrul, and Alparslan: Büyük Selçuklu (marketed as Alparslan the Great).

=== Sports ===
==== Cricket ====
Leagues

- ILT (2023 – present)
- MLC (2023 – present)
- LPL (2023 – present)

National teams

- Afghanistan tour of Bangladesh (ODI) (2023)
- India tour of West Indies (2023)
- India tour of Ireland (2023)
- Australia tour of South Africa (2023)
- New Zealand tour of Bangladesh (ODI) (2023)

International tournaments

- Asia Cup (2023)
- ODI World Cup (2023)
- ICC Champions Trophy (2025)

==== Football ====
- FIFA World Cup (2022, 2026)
- Bangladesh Football League

==== Esports ====
- Collegiate esports championship (2023)

==== Kabaddi ====
- Bangabandhu Cup (2023)

== See also ==
- List of Bangladeshi OTT platforms
