= Photon Factory Films =

Indian film production company

- Type: Film production
- Industry: Motion picture
- Headquarters: Chennai, India
- Key people: Venkatesan yadav Arjun(Creative Head)
- Website: http://www.photonfactoryfilms.com

Photon factory films private limited is an India-based movie production studio/distribution/media and entertainment company along with its sub-brand "FADE IN" advertisements and events management pvt.ltd. founded by B. Venktesan Yadav.

Photon factory started with 2001's Tamil movie "Minnale", later on the company also co-produced movies like "Kaakha Kaakha" and "Vettaiyaadu Vilaiyaadu".

== Fade in Advertisements ==
Fade in "advertisements" private limited includes past clients such as "PepsiCo", "Hyundai", "Mc Dowells", "Hindustan Limited", "Cavin kare", "Coca-Cola", "Parrys confectionery", "Jet airways", "Sony India", "TVS motors", "Aircel", "Sutherland Global services".

== Filmography ==
=== Production ===
Year	Film	Language	Cast	Notes
2001	Minnale	Tamil	Madhavan, Reemma Sen	
2001	Rehnaa Hai Terre Dil Mein	Hindi	Madhavan, Diya Mirza	
2003	Kaakha Kaakha	Tamil	Surya, Jyothika	
2004	Gharshana	Telugu	Daggubati Venkatesh, Asin	
2005	Vettaiyaadu Vilaiyaadu	Tamil	Kamal Haasan, Jyothika	
2012	Osho-The movie	English		Pre-production

=== Distribution ===
Year	Film	Language	Cast	Notes
2012	Saguni	Tamil	Karthi, Pranitha	Only in North india
2012	Saattai	Tamil	Samuthirakani	Only in Tamil Nadu
