= BKL =

BKL may mean:

- Cleveland Burke Lakefront Airport, Ohio, United States
- Big Kernel Lock, a Linux kernel mechanism
- Berik, by ISO 639-3 language code - see ISO 639:b
- BKL singularity, or Belinsky–Khalatnikov–Lifshitz singularity, a Universe evolution model
- Bickley railway station, by station code
- Bolshaya Koltsevaya line, a line of Moscow Metro
- British Kabaddi League, a sports league
