= Michal Spiczko =

Polish kabaddi player (born 1987)

Personal information
- National team: Poland national kabaddi team
- Citizenship: Poland
- Born: 15 July 1987 (age 39)
- Occupations: Kabaddi and football player
- Height: 188 cm (6 ft 2 in)
- Football career

Profile
- Position: Wide receiver

Career history
- 2012-2018: Warsaw Eagles
- 2019-present: Lowlanders Białystok

Sport
- Country: Poland
- Sport: Kabaddi
- Position: Defender
- League: Pro Kabaddi League
- Team: Bengaluru Bulls
Medal record
Representing Poland
European Championships
Winner	European Championships 2019	Team

Michal Spiczko (Polish spelling Michał Śpiczko) is a Polish kabaddi player who currently plays for the Poland national kabaddi team. He has represented his country in the 2016 Kabaddi World Cup, and even captained the national team. In 2016 Kabaddi World Cup, Spiczko scored a total number of 48 points for which he secured the 5th position in the top-scoring player list. He has also played for the Bengaluru Bulls in the second and third season of the Pro Kabaddi League as defender and became the first European kabaddi player to play in the Pro Kabaddi League.

Spiczko is also the Wide receiver for Lowlanders Białystok of the Liga Futbolu Amerykańskiego. He was a two-time MVP for the Warsaw Eagles in the American game before he turned his attention to kabaddi.

== Personal life ==
Spiczko was born on 15 July 1987 in Poland. He received his Bachelor of Science degree in computer engineering from the Warsaw University of Technology in 2011, he then proceeded to the Warsaw School of Economics where he completed master's degrees in Quantitative Methods in Economics & Information Systems in 2014.

== Career ==
=== American football ===
Warsaw Eagles 2012 – 2018

- Season 2012: PLFA8 Vice-Championship - team captain
- Season 2013: Polish American Football League
- Season 2018: TopLiga Championship - team captain

Lowlanders Białystok 2019 – present

- Season 2019: Liga Futbolu Amerykańskiego

=== Kabaddi ===
- 2015: ProKabaddi season 2 for Bengaluru Bulls
- 2016: ProKabaddi season 3 for Bengaluru Bulls
- 2016: Kabaddi World Cup, Ahmedabad – Poland National Kabaddi Team
- 2019: European Kabaddi Championships, Glasgow – Poland National Kabaddi Team
