= United States national kabaddi team =

National kabaddi team of the United States

United States
- Nickname(s): Team USA Kabaddi
- Association: National Kabaddi Federation (USA)
- Confederation: International Kabaddi Federation (IKF)
- Head Coach: James Obilo
- Captain: Troy Bacon; Dillyon Banks (co-captain); Jake Kantor (co-captain)

World Cup
- 1 (first in 2016)
- Group stage (2016)

Kabaddi World Cup
- 1 (first in 2025)
- Quarterfinals (2025)
Medal record
Event	1st	2nd	3rd
Circle World Cup	0	0	2
Total	0	0	2

The United States national kabaddi team represent the United States of America in international men's kabaddi competition. The team first competed at the 2016 Kabaddi World Cup in India, where they placed 12th.

The team, led by Captain Troy Bacon and Co-Captains Dillyon Banks and Jake Kantor, has recruited Head Coach James Obilo. Obilo is a defender from Kenya and holds the record for most tackle points ever scored in an international match (13 points).

USA Kabaddi is preparing to launch a USA Kabaddi League and USA Kabaddi Cup. The team intends to assist the sport in bidding for Olympic Games inclusion as they continue to spread the sport globally.

== History ==
The United States kabaddi team for the 2016 Kabaddi World Cup was formed by Florida A&M University graduate Celestine Jones just before the tournament. It consisted of athletes and musicians from the university who had backgrounds in other sports, but no prior kabaddi experience. Despite facing lopsided losses, the team's presence in the tournament was seen as a sign of the growing popularity of kabaddi in the United States.

Today, the team trains out of Atlanta, Georgia in preparation for the upcoming Kabaddi World Cup, USA Kabaddi Cup, and USA Kabaddi League. The team intends to assist the sport in bidding for Olympic inclusion as they continue to spread the sport globally.

== Team ==
Name	Position	Role
James Obilo	Defender	Coach
Troy Bacon	Defender	Captain
Dillyon Banks	Raider	Co-Captain
Jake Kantor	Raider	Co-Captain
Bismark Charles	Defender	
Ben Marcellus	Defender	
Tristan Shonfield	All Rounder	
Alex Joeseph	All Rounder	
Na’im	All Rounder	
Kadir	All Rounder	
Raheem	Defender	
Yabo	Defender	
Hitesh	All Rounder	
Victor Lawrence	All Rounder	
Devin Anderson	Defender	
Jamil Lovett-Harvey	Defender	

== 2016 Kabaddi World Cup ==
The U.S. squad was one of several newcomer teams at the World Cup that The Guardian classified as being a "ragtag [unit] of novices, part-timers, and transplants from other sports". The team, composed primarily of athletes and hip-hop musicians from the historically black Florida A&M University, was recruited through word-of-mouth advertising and social media posts. One member was recruited through a text message that asked "Do you want to go to India?".

They briefly trained in Jacksonville on a baseball field before traveling to India for the tournament. None of the players were familiar with kabaddi, but had experience in other sports such as American football, Track and field, and basketball. Team member Dillyon Banks felt that the training regiment of two sessions per-day was demanding, remarking that "there were people throwin' up on the field. We're not getting paid to do this. The dedication, the heart, the team effort it took in a short period of time to make this whole thing work is what brought us together."

The U.S. team was greeted with a "U-S-A!" chant as they emerged from the plane. The inexperienced team opened the tournament with a 52–12 loss to tournament favorites Iran, followed by similarly lopsided losses to Japan, Poland, Thailand, and Kenya. Having to compete against top countries such as India and Iran in their first competition ever, was "almost like trying to learn basketball by playing against the Golden State Warriors.". Captain Kushim Sun Rey remarked that "if you're on defense and one person makes a wrong move, you can end up losing major points."

The Hindustan Times felt that the U.S. team were a "quirk" of the tournament, "even by its regular standards considering pharmacists and engineers are competing against monks and fishermen", but stood out from others with their display of hip-hop culture, reporting that "their dreadlocked players take to the kabaddi mats with their nicknames on their backs. McKie wears his rap name 'Pharoh D' on the back of his shirt. Kevin Caldwell, an all rounder, wears 'Hustle' on his jersey. Fields' shirt also has his rap name 'Ronnie Eriic'. Another teammate is called 'Swag'."

It was argued that the presence of the U.S. and other newcomers was a sign that the sport of kabaddi was experiencing "[a] revolution from dusty provincial pastime to international media spectacle", and could begin to develop a following in the United States.

== Tournament results ==
=== 2016 Kabaddi World Cup ===
The United States were drawn into Group B for the group stage of the tournament.

7 October 2016

United States	15–52	Iran
	Report

9 October 2016

United States	19–45	Japan
	Report

14 October 2016

United States	29–75	Poland
	Report

16 October 2016

Thailand	69–22	United States
	Report

18 October 2016

United States	19–74	Kenya
	Report
