= Kabaddi in the United Kingdom =

Kabaddi is a contact team sport played mainly by the South Asian community in the United Kingdom. The British Kabaddi League is the main kabaddi competition in the UK, and is played annually. The 2025 Kabaddi World Cup will be hosted in the West Midlands region of England.

== History ==
Kabaddi was first promoted to a significant extent in the UK when it was shown on Channel 4 in the 1990s. The growth of the South Asian community in the UK has also grown the sport. The cost-of-living crisis is also a factor in kabaddi's growth, as it is an inexpensive sport to play.

== Controversy ==
There have been several incidents of violence at kabaddi tournaments in the UK, as well as alleged ties between kabaddi and gang activities.

== See also ==
- Kho kho in the United Kingdom
