= Bangabandhu Cup (kabaddi) =

International Kabaddi tournament

- Country: Bangladesh
- Administrator: Bangladesh Kabaddi Federation
- First tournament: 2021
- Last tournament: 2024
- Number of teams: 12
- Current champions: Bangladesh
- Most successful: Bangladesh (4 titles)
- TV partner(s): T Sports (2021—present)
- 2024 Bangabandhu Cup

The Bangabandhu Cup (Bengali: বঙ্গবন্ধু কাপ) is an international kabaddi tournament held in Bangladesh. It is named after the father of the nation, Bangabandhu Sheikh Mujibur Rahman. The first edition took place in 2021.

== History ==
The first edition took place in 2021. Five countries from three continents competed in the tournament which are Bangladesh, Nepal and Sri Lanka from Asia, Kenya from Africa and Poland from Europe. Bangladesh finished group stage as first and advanced to the final. Sri Lanka and Kenya finished group stage as second and third and advanced to the qualifier. Kenya won the qualifier and advanced to the final. Bangladesh defeated Kenya and became the champions.

The second edition took place in 2022. Four new teams participated which are Iraq, Indonesia, Malaysia from Asia and England from Europe. A total of 8 countries from three continents participated in 2nd edition. Except Poland all other teams from previous edition participated in the second edition. Poland didn't participate because of the Russian invasion of Ukraine. Eight teams were split into two groups. Bangladesh won the cup for the second time by beating Kenya and Kenya became the runner's up for the second time.

The third edition took place in 2023 from 13 to 21 March. Twelve teams from four continents participated in this edition. All 8 teams from previous edition and Poland from 1st edition competed in the tournament. Argentina from South America, Thailand and Chinese Taipei from Asia participated for the first time in this edition. 12 teams were split into two groups. Bangladesh defeated Chinese Taipei in the final and became champions for the third time. Top two teams (Bangladesh and Chinese Taipei) automatically qualified for the world cup.

== Summary ==
Year	Host	Final			Third place		
Year	Host	Champions	Score	Runner-up	Third place		
2021	(Bangladesh); Dhaka	Bangladesh	34–28	Kenya	Sri Lanka		
2022	(Bangladesh); Dhaka	Bangladesh	34–31	Kenya	Iraq	and	Sri Lanka
2023	(Bangladesh); Dhaka	Bangladesh	42–28	Chinese Taipei	Thailand	and	Iraq
2024	(Bangladesh); Dhaka	Bangladesh	45–31	Nepal	Kenya	and	Thailand

== Tournament summary ==
Team	Appearances			Best result
Team	Total	First	Latest	Best result
Bangladesh	4	2021	2024	Champions (2021, 2022, 2023, 2024)
Kenya	4	2021	2024	Runner's up (2021, 2022)
Chinese Taipei	1	2023	2023	Runner's up (2023)
Nepal	4	2021	2024	Runner's up (2024)
Sri Lanka	4	2021	2024	
Poland	3	2021	2024	
England	2	2022	2023	
Iraq	3	2022	2024	
Malaysia	3	2022	2024	
Indonesia	3	2022	2024	
Argentina	1	2023	2023	
Thailand	2	2023	2024	
South Korea	1	2024	2024	
Japan	1	2024	2024	
Uganda	1	2024	2024	
