= James Obilo =

Kenyan kabaddi player

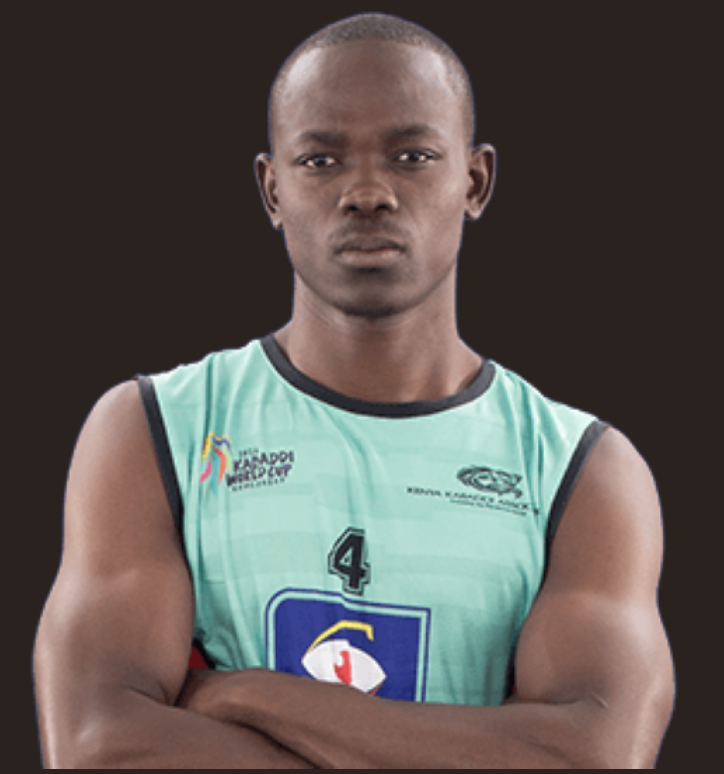

Personal information
- Nationality: Kenyan
- Occupations: USA Coach; Kabaddi Player
- Years active: 2016 - present

Sport
- Country: Kenya
- Sport: Kabaddi
- Position: Defender
Medal record
Representing Kenya
2016 Kabaddi World Cup
Winner	Man of the Match	vs. Japan

James Obilo is a Kenyan professional Kabaddi player who plays for the Kenya national kabaddi Team. He is known for his defensive skills and currently serves as the defensive coach for the United States national kabaddi team.

In the 2016 Kabaddi World Cup, Obilo set a new record for the most tackle points in an international Kabaddi match, scoring 13 tackle points and 4 super tackles against Japan. This achievement remains unbeaten and has solidified his reputation as a skilled defensive player in the Kabaddi community.

== Early life ==
James Obilo was born in Kenya and completed his education at Kenyatta University for environmental science. Obilo led the team's defense in the 2016 Kabaddi World Cup. The tournament was a turning point for Obilo, and his exceptional performance caught the attention of the United States national kabaddi team, which led to his move to the United States, where he currently lives and coaches the team.

== Career ==
=== 2016 Kabaddi World Cup ===
==== Kenya vs Japan ====
James Obilo played a crucial role in Kenya's victory against Japan in the Kabaddi World Cup. With scoring 13 tackle points and forcing four super tackles, Obilo earned the title of most tackle points in any international kabaddi match ever. Obilo was instrumental in Kenya's defensive strategy which resulted in a record nine super tackles in the match, leading to a final score of 48–27. Obilo's performance in this match showcased his ability to lead and marshal the Kenyan defense, earning him the title of the key man in the match. Obilo's contributions to Kenya's defensive strategy helped the team secure a fourth place in Group B, remaining in contention for a semi-final berth.
