= Kabaddi World Cup (World Kabaddi) =

International kabaddi competition

- Most recent season or competition: 2025 Kabaddi World Cup (World Kabaddi)
- Founded: 2019; 7 years ago
- First season: 2019 Melaka
- Administrator: World Kabaddi
- No. of teams: M: 9; W: 6
- Region: Global
- Most recent champions: M: India (2nd title); W: India (2nd title)
- Most titles: M: India (2 titles); W: India (2 titles)
- Website: https://worldcupkabaddi.org/

The Kabaddi World Cup, is an indoor international kabaddi tournament conducted by the World Kabaddi. It follows the standard style (indoors on a rectangular court) and is contested by both men's and women's national teams. The format involves a round-robin tournament followed by a knockout stage.

The World Cup has been held once (in 2019) with another scheduled for 2025. Unlike its IKF counterpart, all World Cups of World Kabaddi were held outside India to globalise the event. In 2019, both the men's and women's competitions were won by the Indian teams.

== World Kabaddi ==
World Kabaddi
- Sport: Kabaddi
- Membership: 50+
- Founded: 24 March 2018; 8 years ago
- Headquarters: Shah Alam, Selangor, Malaysia
- Location: Malaysia
- President: Osama Said (Egypt, 2025–present) formerly Ashok Das (England)
- Vice president: Ratnagar Singh Dhillon (Pan America) Jagjit Singh Gurm (Oceania) Abdallah Mustafa Athumani Nyoni (Africa) Sheikh A Rahman Mubarak A H Al-Thani (Asia)
- Secretary: Secretary General: S. T. Arasu (Malaysia, since inception)
- (founded): 24th March 2018

Official website
- www.theworldkabaddi.org
- Other key staff: Dr Wyman Tang (Treasurer)

World Kabaddi (Note: Not to be confused with the World Kabaddi Federation founded in 2003 or the now-folded World Kabaddi League of 2014–2018.) was formed on 24th March 2018, a day it now celebrates as "World Kabaddi Day".

The World Kabaddi has focused in spreading the game beyond Asia, especially in Europe and Africa, and as of 2024, World Kabaddi had more than 50 member countries. However, some countries that participate in International Kabaddi Federation events cannot participate in World Kabaddi events as they do not have a governing body affiliated to the World Kabaddi. Countries that participate in both IKF and World Kabaddi sanctioned events have separate governing bodies for each affiliation.

In 2024, at a World Kabaddi Day event organised by HIPSA and World Kabaddi at Panchkula, it set a Guinness World Record for the most players in a kabaddi exhibition match.

== History ==
The 2019 World Cup was hosted by Malaysia Kabaddi Federation (Note: Not to be confused with Malaysian Kabaddi Federation which is affiliated to the IKF.) in Melaka. It was initially scheduled for April, but was postponed to July. The Indian team, selected by New Kabaddi Federation, won the inaugural men's and women's competitions in the finals. Iraq and Taiwan were 2nd and 3rd respectively in the men's competition, whereas Taiwan and Malaysia were 2nd and 3rd in the women's competition.

The 2025 World Cup was hosted in West Midlands and was supported by the West Midlands Combined Authority. The tournament took place from 17–23 March with venues in Wolverhampton, Walsall, Birmingham and Coventry. Both the men's and women's tournaments were won by India, with England being the runner's up. Scotland and Hong Kong China were 3rd in the men's and women's tournaments respectively.

The 2027 World Cup is scheduled to be held in Canada.

In preparation for the growth of international kabaddi in North America, the Pan America Kabaddi Association, in collaboration with the Canada Kabaddi Alliance and USA Kabaddi Association, announced plans to host the 2027 Kabaddi World Cup in Canada. The event is expected to feature men’s and women’s national teams from multiple countries across Asia, Europe, Pan America, and other international regions.

The Canada Kabaddi Alliance and Pan America Kabaddi Association have promoted kabaddi through events such as the Canada National Championship and the Kabaddi Rising Stars League (KRSL/KRSPL), which included players from countries including India, Argentina, the United Kingdom, and the United States. Matches were broadcast through multiple South Asian and international media platforms with English, Hindi, and Punjabi commentary.

== Editions and results ==
=== Men ===
Year	Host	Final			Third place match			Number of teams
Year	Host	Winner	Score	Runner-up	Third place	Score	Fourth place	Number of teams
2019	(Malaysia) Melaka	India	57–27	Iraq	Taiwan	45–21	Malaysia	8
2025	(England) West Midlands	India	44–41	England	Scotland	67–56	Wales	9

=== Women ===
Year	Host	Final			Third place match			Number of teams
Year	Host	Winner	Score	Runner-up	Third place	Score	Fourth place	Number of teams
2019	(Malaysia) Melaka	India	47–29	Taiwan	Malaysia	53–26	Hong Kong	4
2025	(England) West Midlands	India	57–34	England	Hong Kong China	75–14	Wales	6

== Medal table ==
=== Men ===
Rank	Nation	Gold	Silver	Bronze	Total
1	India	2	0	0	2
2	England	0	1	0	1
2	Iraq	0	1	0	1
4	Scotland	0	0	1	1
4	Taiwan	0	0	1	1
Totals (5 entries)		2	2	2	6

=== Women ===
Rank	Nation	Gold	Silver	Bronze	Total
1	India	2	0	0	2
2	England	0	1	0	1
2	Taiwan	0	1	0	1
4	Hong Kong China	0	0	1	1
4	Malaysia	0	0	1	1
Totals (5 entries)		2	2	2	6

== Team results ==
=== Men ===
Team	(Malaysia) 2019	(England) 2025	Total
Australia	5th		1
England		2nd	1
Hong Kong China	6th	QF	2
Hungary		QF	1
India	1st	1st	2
Iraq	2nd		1
Italy		GS	1
Malaysia	4th		1
New Zealand	8th		1
Norway	7th		1
Poland		QF	1
Scotland		3rd	1
Taiwan	3rd		1
Wales		4th	1
United States		QF	1
Total	8	9	

=== Women ===
Team	(Malaysia) 2019	(England) 2025	Total
England		2nd	1
Hong Kong China	4th	3rd	2
Hungary		GS	1
India	1st	1st	2
Malaysia	3rd		1
Poland		GS	1
Taiwan	2nd		1
Wales		4	1
Total	4	6	
