= UEFA Euro 2024 broadcasting rights =

UEFA Euro 2024 was a football tournament played between 14 June and 14 July 2024 that involved 24 men's national teams from nations affiliated to the Union of European Football Associations (UEFA). The tournament was broadcast via television and radio all over the world.

== Television ==
=== In-Flight and International Waters ===
Rights holder	Ref.
Sport 24	

=== UEFA ===
Territory	Rights holder	Ref.
Albania	TV Klan; Tring	
Andorra	RTVE; TF1; M6	
Armenia	Armenia TV	
Austria	ORF; ServusTV	
Azerbaijan	İctimai Television; CBC Sport	
Belarus	Capital TV; RTR	
Belgium	RTBF; VRT	
Bosnia and Herzegovina	BHRT	
Bulgaria	BNT; Nova	
Croatia	HRT	
Cyprus	CyBC	
Czech Republic	ČT	
Denmark	DR; TV 2	
Estonia	ERR; TV3 Group	
Finland	Yle	
France	TF1; M6; beIN Sports	
Georgia	GPB	
Germany	ARD; ZDF; RTL; Magenta Sport	
Greece	ERT	
Hungary	MTVA	
Iceland	RÚV	
Ireland	RTÉ	
Israel	Charlton; KAN	
Italy	RAI; Sky Sport	
Kazakhstan	Qazaqstan	
Kosovo	Artmotion	
Latvia	TV3 Group	
Liechtenstein	SRG SSR	
Lithuania	TV3 Group	
Malta	PBS	
Moldova	TRM	
Montenegro	RTCG; Arena Sport	
Netherlands	NOS	
North Macedonia	MRT; Arena Sport	
Norway	NRK; TV 2	
Poland	TVP	
Portugal	RTP; SIC; TVI; SportTV	
Romania	Pro TV	
Russia	Match TV; Okko Sport	
San Marino	RAI; Sky Sport	
Serbia	RTS; Arena Sport	
Slovakia	TV Markíza	
Slovenia	RTV; Sport Klub	
Spain	RTVE	
Sweden	SVT; TV4	
Switzerland	SRG SSR	
Turkey	TRT	
Ukraine	Suspilne; Megogo	
United Kingdom	BBC; ITV	
Vatican	RAI; Sky Sport	

=== Rest of the world ===
Territory	Rights holder	Ref.
Angola	TPA	
Australia	Optus Sport	
Bangladesh	T Sports	
Brazil	Grupo Globo; CazéTV	
Brunei	RTB	
Cambodia	CTN	
Cameroon	CRTV; Canal 2; Dash TV	
Canada	TSN; TVA Sports; TLN	
Caribbean	Rush Sports	
Central America	ESPN	
Central Asia	Saran Media	
Chad	Tchadinfos	
China	iQIYI; CCTV; China Mobile	
Comoros	ORTC	
Congo	Télé Congo	
Cuba	ICRT	
Democratic Republic of the Congo	RTNC	
East Timor	RTTL; ETO	
El Salvador	TCS	
Fiji	FBC	
Gabon	RTG	
Gambia	GRTS	
Guinea	RTG	
Hong Kong	now TV	
Indian subcontinent	Sony Sports Network	
Indonesia	MNC Media	
Ivory Coast	RTI	
Japan	WOWOW; Abema	
Kenya	K24 TV	
Kyrgyzstan	KTRK	
Macau	M Plus; IQIYI	
Madagascar	TVM	
Malaysia	SPOTV	
Maldives	PSM	
Mali	ORTM	
Mauritius	MBC	
MENA	beIN Sports	
Mexico	Sky México	
Mongolia	Central TV; Premier Sports	
Mozambique	TVM	
New Zealand	TVNZ	
Pacific Islands	Digicel	
Pakistan	Tapmad	
Papua New Guinea	NBC	
Rwanda	Magic Sports TV	
Senegal	RTS	
Singapore	SPOTV; Mediacorp	
South America (Note: except Brazil)	ESPN	
South Korea	CJ ENM	
Sub-Saharan Africa	New World TV; SuperSport; Sporty TV	
Taiwan	ELTA	
Tajikistan	Varzish TV	
Tanzania	ZBC	
Thailand	TrueVisions; PPTV; MCOT; Thairath TV	
Uganda	NBS	
United States	FOX; FuboTV; TelevisaUnivision	
Uzbekistan	Zo'r TV; Setanta Sports	
Vietnam	Viettel; HTV; VTV	
Zambia	ZNBC	
