= GTV (Bangladeshi TV channel) =

Bangladeshi TV channel

- Country: Bangladesh
- Broadcast area: Nationwide
- Headquarters: Segun Bagicha, Dhaka

Programming
- Language: Bengali
- Picture format: 1080i HDTV (downscaled to 16:9 576i for SDTV sets)

Ownership
- Owner: Gazi Group

History
- Launched: 12 June 2012; 14 years ago

Links
- Website: gazitv.com

GTV (Bengali: জিটিভি), also known as Gazi Television (Bengali: গাজী টেলিভিশন; lit. 'Ghazi TV'), is a Bangladeshi Bengali-language satellite and cable television channel owned by Gazi Group Commencing broadcasts on 12 June 2012, it is based in Segun Bagicha in Dhaka. The channel is owned by Gazi Group, which is owned by Golam Dastagir Gazi, who is the former Minister of Textiles and Jute and a member of the Bangladesh Awami League party.

== History ==
GTV received its license to broadcast from the Bangladesh Telecommunication Regulatory Commission, along with several other privately owned Bangladeshi television channels, on 20 October 2009. It officially began broadcasting on 12 June 2012. GTV was available for streaming on phones through Teletalk's 3G services in October 2012. Coinciding its third anniversary in June 2015, GTV adopted a new logo and slogan, "Ja Dekhte Chan, Paben" (যা দেখতে চান, পাবেন; lit. 'You will get what you want to see'). Along with Bangladesh Television and Maasranga Television, GTV broadcast the 2016 Asia Cup for Bangladeshi audiences.

== Programming ==
The channel offers a variety of programming including news, movies, dramas, talk shows, sports, and more. In 2014 this channel bought television broadcasting right from BCB for ৳1.56 billion (US$13 million) for 6 years (from 2014 to 2020). In 2016 it also bought broadcasting rights of BPL from BCB.

=== List of programming ===
- Alif Laila
- Bagha-Sher
- Bangladesh Premier League
- Jononi
- Kung Fu Panda: Legends of Awesomeness
- Mayajal
- Shilpo Bari
- Shodh
- Super Girls
- Teenage Mutant Ninja Turtles

== Sport broadcasting rights ==
=== Cricket ===
- Bangladesh Premier League (along with T Sports)
- Cricket World Cup (along with T Sports)
- Asia Cup (along with T Sports)
- Bangladesh national cricket team matches (along with T Sports)

=== Football ===
- FIFA World Cup (along with T Sports)
- FIFA Women's World Cup (along with T Sports)

== See also ==
- List of television stations in Bangladesh
