= 2025 Kabaddi World Cup (World Kabaddi) =

- Official logo of the 2025 Kabbadi World Cup

Tournament information
- Dates: 17–23 March 2025
- Administrator: Host: England Kabaddi; Scottish Kabaddi; British Kabaddi League; Sanctioned by: World Kabaddi
- Format: Standard style
- Tournament format(s): Round-robin and Knockout
- Host(s): England
- Venue: Wolverhampton; Coventry; Birmingham; Walsall
- Participants: 9 teams (Men's); 6 teams (Women's)
- Website: https://kabaddiworldcup2025.com/

Final positions
- Champions: India (Men's); India (Women's)
- 1st runners-up: England (Men's); England (Women's)
- 2nd runners-up: Scotland (Men's); Hong Kong China (Women's)

Tournament statistics
- Matches played: 34 (M: 24, W: 10)

The 2025 Kabaddi World Cup was the second edition of the Kabaddi World Cup held under the authority of World Kabaddi. It was hosted in the West Midlands, England, during 17–23 March 2025. There were both men's and women's competitions in the tournament.

As the event was being held, the International Kabaddi Federation (IKF) issued a statement clarifying that the event was not authorised by the IKF and the outcome would not be recognised by the Olympic Council of Asia, the Asian Kabaddi Federation (AKF), or the Asian Games.

The India team won both the men's and women's World Kabaddi championship events, with England as the runner-up in both cases.

== History ==
The previous World Cup organised by World Kabaddi was held in Melaka, Malaysia in 2019. A 2020 edition of the tournament was scheduled, but then was cancelled due to the COVID-19 pandemic.

The decision to award the 2025 World Cup to the West Midlands of England was in part due to its hosting of the British Kabaddi League and the 2022 Commonwealth Games, as well as its significant South Asian community. The event was supported by the West Midlands Combined Authority. The drawing of groups was held on 7 December 2024.

The tournament was initially planned to feature 16 teams in the men's competition and 8 teams in the women's competition. However, due to visa and other challenges, the tournament was later scaled down to 10 teams in the men's and 6 teams in the women's competition.

== Venues ==
Venue	City	Dates
WV Active Aldersley	Wolverhampton	17 March 2025; 18 March 2025; 22 March 2025; 23 March 2025
CBS Arena	Coventry	19 March 2025
Nechells Wellbeing Centre	Birmingham	20 March 2025
Walsall Campus Sports Centre	Walsall	21 March 2025

== Men's group stage ==
=== Group A ===
Team	Pld	W	D	L	P	SF	SA	SD
England	3	3	0	0	6	249	81	168
Poland	3	2	0	1	4	174	126	48
United States	3	1	0	2	2	145	173	-28
Hungary	3	0	0	3	0	87	275	-188

- advanced to the knockout stage

17 March 2025
11:00

England	101–25	Hungary

WV Active Aldersley, Wolverhampton

17 March 2025
18:00

United States	87–35	Hungary

WV Active Aldersley, Wolverhampton

18 March 2025
16:00

Poland	87–27	Hungary

WV Active Aldersley, Wolverhampton

19 March 2025
13:00

England	87–20	United States

CBS Arena, Coventry

20 March 2025
11:00

United States	38–51	Poland

Nechells Wellbeing Centre, Birmingham

20 March 2025
16:00

England	61–36	Poland

Nechells Wellbeing Centre, Birmingham

=== Group B ===
Team	Pld	W	D	L	P	SF	SA	SD
India	4	3	1	0	7	303	154	149
Scotland	4	3	1	0	7	286	168	118
Wales	4	2	0	2	4	229	246	-17
Hong Kong China	4	1	0	3	2	151	261	-110
Italy	4	0	0	4	0	137	277	-140

- advanced to the knockout stage

17 March 2025
12:00

India	64–22	Italy

WV Active Aldersley, Wolverhampton

17 March 2025
17:00

Scotland	63–43	Wales

WV Active Aldersley, Wolverhampton

18 March 2025
10:00

Italy	32–71	Wales

WV Active Aldersley, Wolverhampton

18 March 2025
17:00

India	64–64	Scotland

WV Active Aldersley, Wolverhampton

18 March 2025
18:00

Hong Kong China	49–68	Wales

WV Active Aldersley, Wolverhampton

19 March 2025
14:00

Scotland	89–33	Italy

CBS Arena, Coventry

19 March 2025
15:00

India	73–21	Hong Kong China

CBS Arena, Coventry

20 March 2025
12:00

Hong Kong China	28–70	Scotland

Nechells Wellbeing Centre, Birmingham

20 March 2025
15:00

India	102–47	Wales

Nechells Wellbeing Centre, Birmingham

20 March 2025
17:00

Hong Kong China	53–50	Italy

Nechells Wellbeing Centre, Birmingham

== Men's knockout stage ==
Quarterfinals
A1	England	89
B4	Hong Kong China	23
A3	United States	30
B2	Scotland	89
A2	Poland	38
B3	Wales	52
A4	Hungary	24
B1	India	69

Semifinals
QF1W	England	84
QF2W	Scotland	36
QF3W	Wales	37
QF4W	India	93

Finals
SF1W	England	41
SF2W	India	44
Third place
SF1L	Scotland	67
SF2L	Wales	56

=== Quarter-finals ===
Quarter-final 1
21 March 2025
12:30

England	89–23	Hong Kong China

Walsall Campus Sports Centre, Walsall

Quarter-final 2
21 March 2025
14:15

United States	30–89	Scotland

Walsall Campus Sports Centre, Walsall

Quarter-final 3
21 March 2025
15:30

Poland	38–52	Wales

Walsall Campus Sports Centre, Walsall

Quarter-final 4
21 March 2025
16:45

Hungary	24–69	India

Walsall Campus Sports Centre, Walsall

=== Semi-finals ===
Semi-final 1
22 March 2025
13:15

England	84–36	Scotland

WV Active Aldersley, Wolverhampton

Semi-final 2
22 March 2025
14:30

Wales	37–93	India

WV Active Aldersley, Wolverhampton

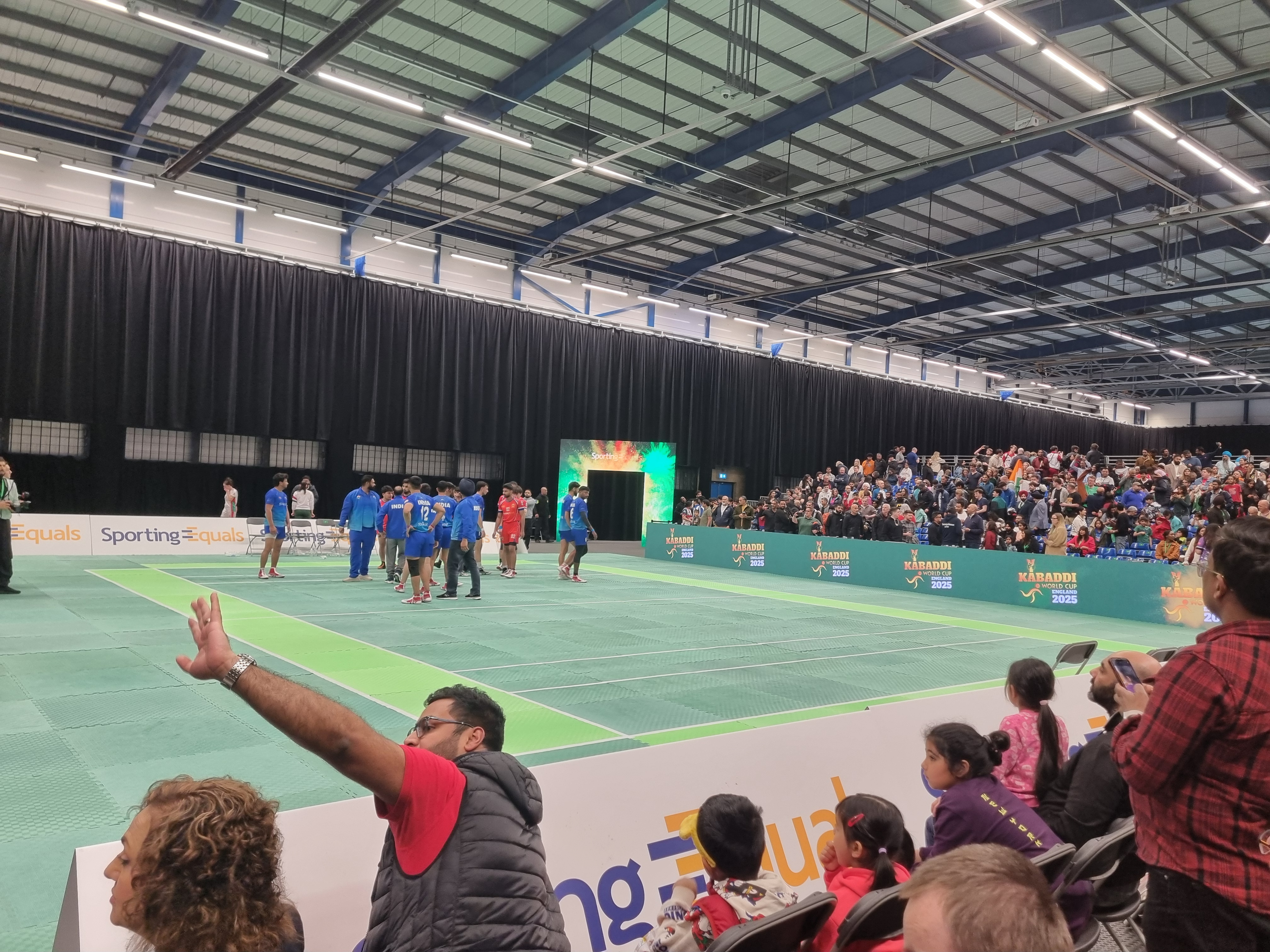
Team India after victory

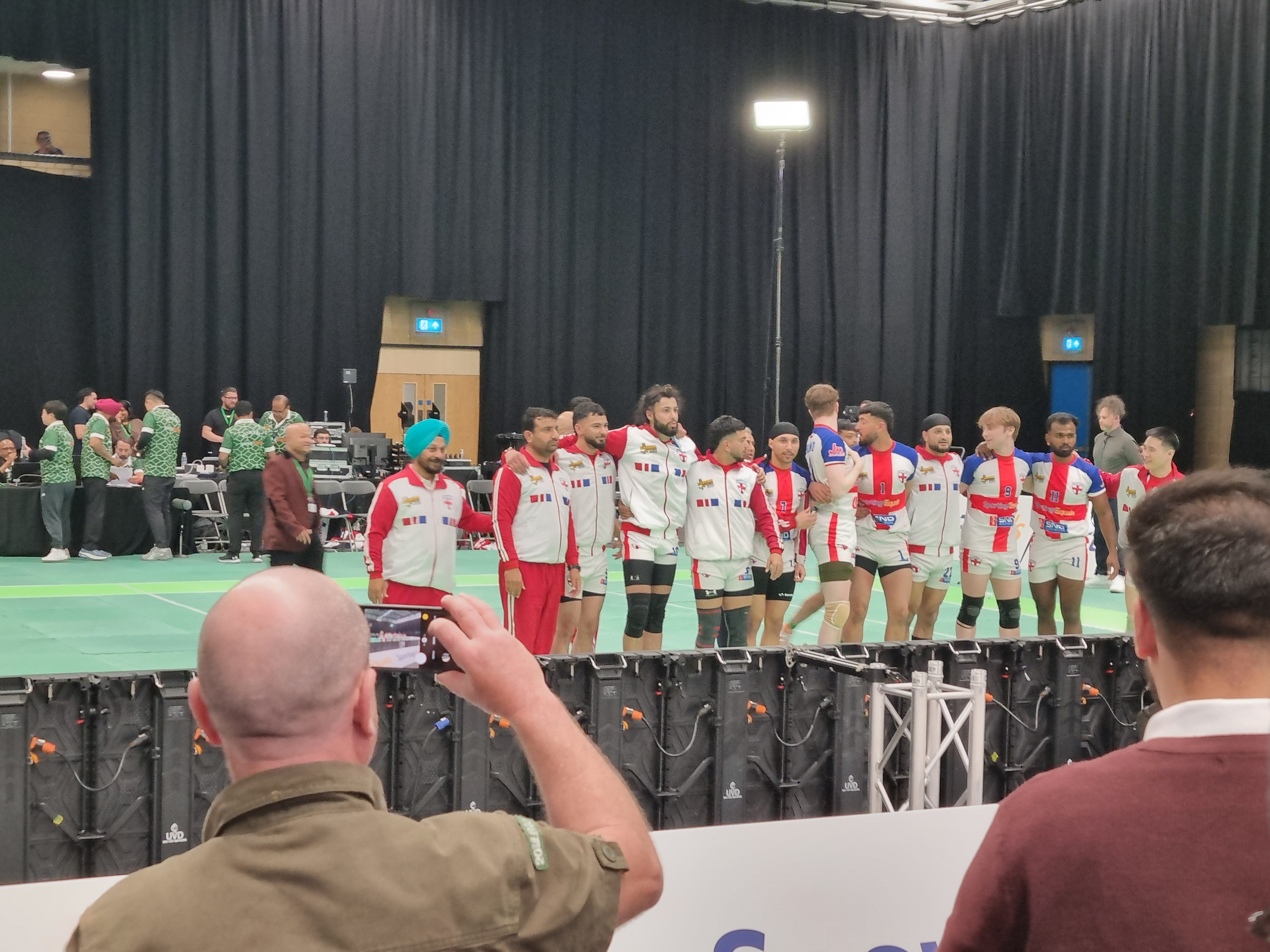
Team England after victory

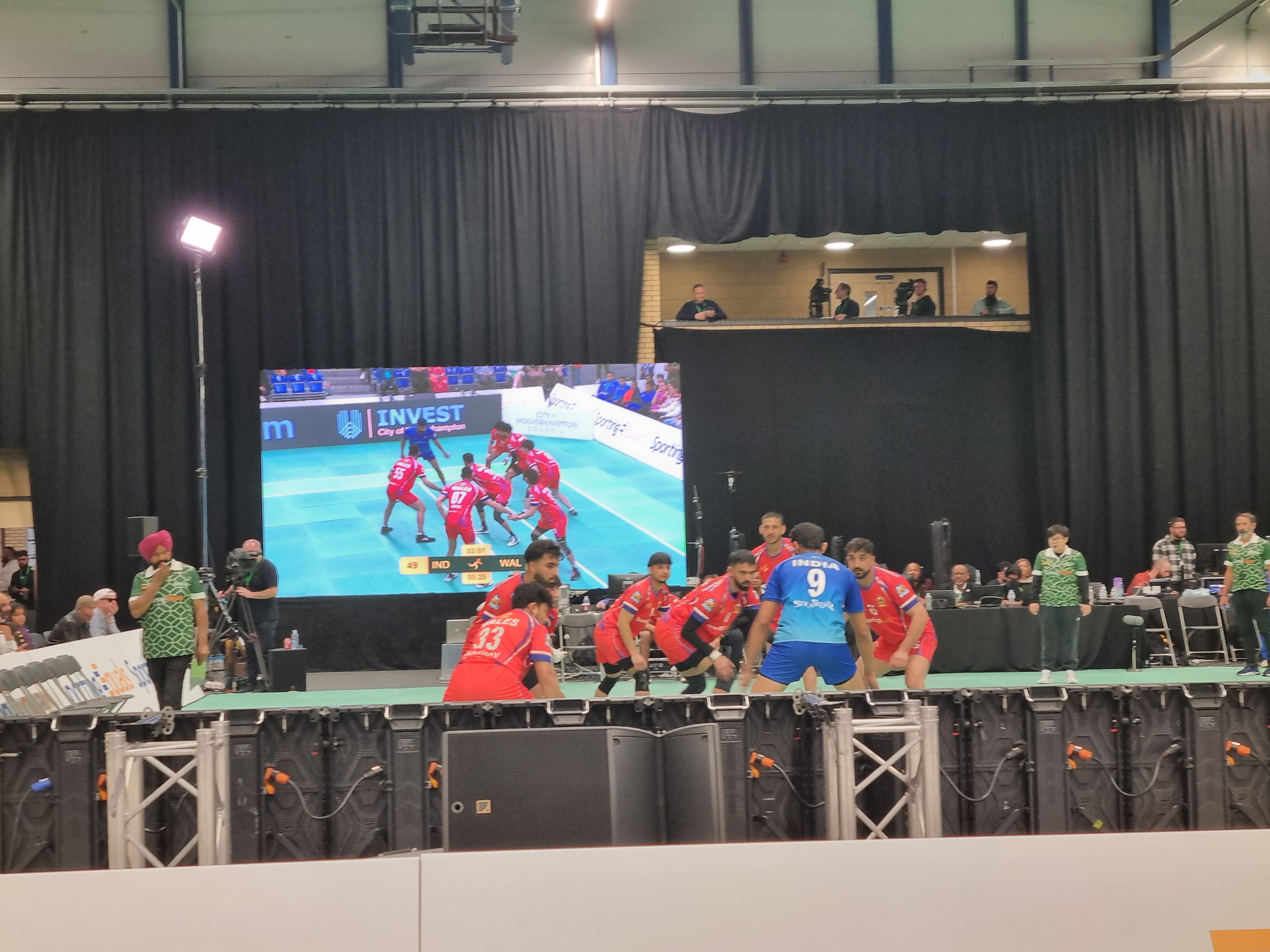
India vs Wales

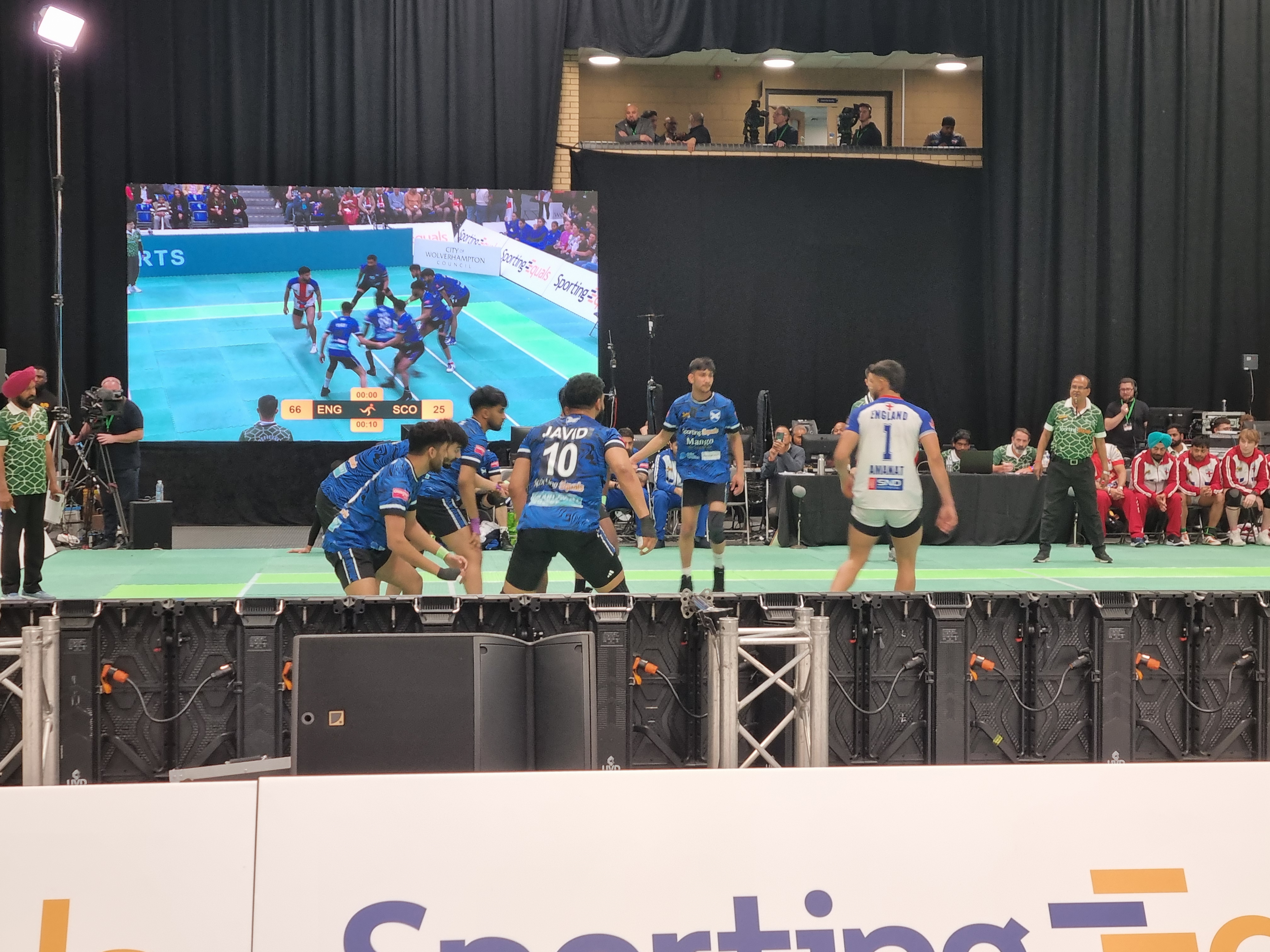
Scotland vs England

=== 3rd place match ===
23 March 2025
12:00

Scotland	67–56	Wales

WV Active Aldersley, Wolverhampton

=== Final ===
23 March 2025
15:30

England	41–44	India

WV Active Aldersley, Wolverhampton

== Women's group stage ==
=== Group D ===
Team	Pld	W	D	L	P	SF	SA	SD
India	2	2	0	0	4	193	33	160
Wales	2	1	0	1	2	76	133	-57
Poland	2	0	0	2	0	59	162	-103

- advanced to the knockout stage

17 March 2025
13:00

Poland	44–58	Wales

WV Active Aldersley, Wolverhampton

18 March 2025
12:00

India	89–18	Wales

WV Active Aldersley, Wolverhampton

19 March 2025
09:00

India	104–15	Poland

CBS Arena, Coventry

=== Group E ===
Team	Pld	W	D	L	P	SF	SA	SD
England	2	2	0	0	4	130	54	76
Hong Kong China	2	1	0	1	2	112	65	47
Hungary	2	0	0	2	0	35	158	-123

- advanced to the knockout stage

17 March 2025
15:00

Hong Kong China	73–20	Hungary

WV Active Aldersley, Wolverhampton

18 March 2025
15:00

England	85–15	Hungary

WV Active Aldersley, Wolverhampton

19 March 2025
11:00

England	45–39	Hong Kong China

CBS Arena, Coventry

== Women's knockout stage ==
Semifinals
A1	India	53
B2	Hong Kong China	15
A2	Wales	25
B1	England	72

Finals
SF1W	India	57
SF2W	England	34
Third place
SF1L	Hong Kong China	75
SF2L	Wales	14

=== Semi-finals ===
Semi-final 1
21 March 2025
09:30

India	53–15	Hong Kong China

Walsall Campus Sports Centre, Walsall

Semi-final 2
21 March 2025
11:15

Wales	25–72	England

Walsall Campus Sports Centre, Walsall

=== 3rd place match ===
22 March 2025
12:00

Hong Kong China	75–14	Wales

WV Active Aldersley, Wolverhampton

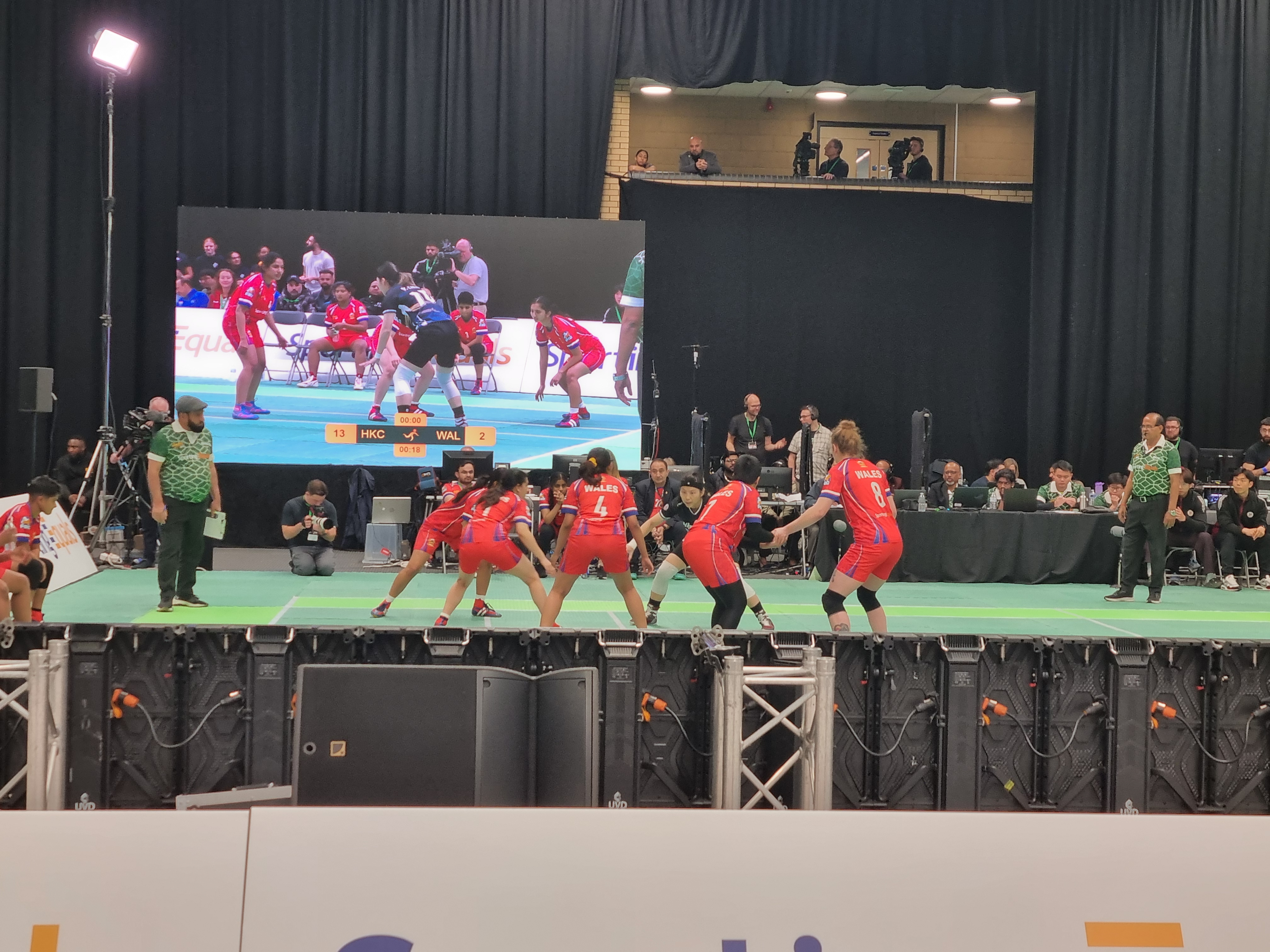
Wales vs Hong Kong China

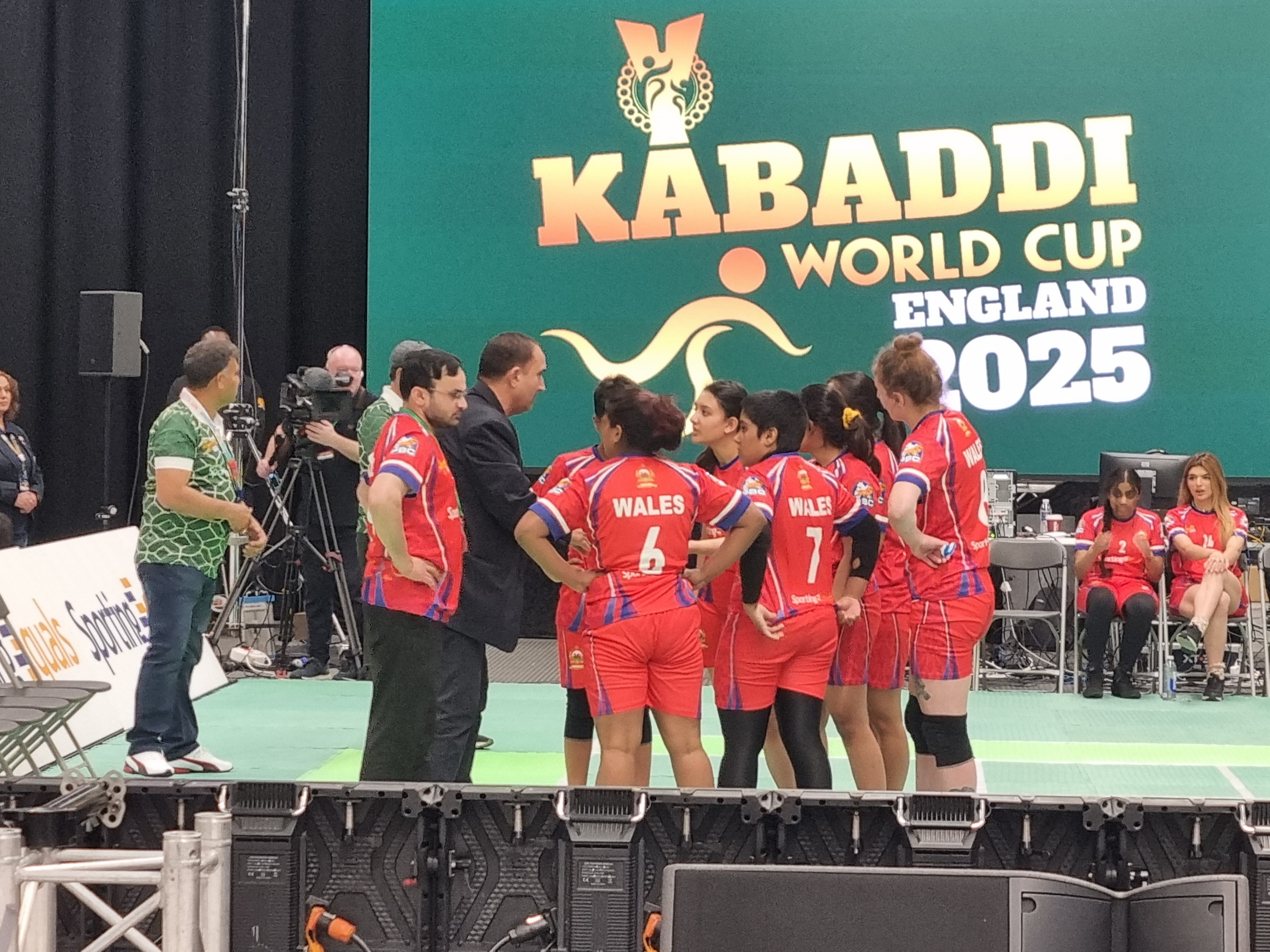
Team Wales

=== Final ===
23 March 2025
13:45

India	57–34	England

WV Active Aldersley, Wolverhampton

== Broadcasting ==
Country	Broadcaster
Rights distribution partner	Dice sports
Worldwide	talkSPORTKabaddi on YouTube; Olympic Channel (semi-final onwards)
Fiji	Fijian Broadcasting Corporation
India	DD Sports; Waves India
Indonesia	TVRI
Mauritius	Mauritius Broadcasting Corporation
Sri Lanka	Sri Lanka Rupavahini Corporation; ThePapare 1 (SD & HD)
Tanzania	Azam TV
United Kingdom	BBC iPlayer
United Kingdom and Europe	Zee Punjabi
USA and Canada	Willow TV
