= List of Bangladeshi OTT platforms =

Over-the-top (OTT) platforms in Bangladesh refer to video streaming services delivered via the internet without traditional broadcast or satellite systems. In recent years, Bangladesh has experienced a rapid growth in locally owned OTT platforms due to rising smartphone usage, affordable data, and increased demand for digital entertainment. These platforms offer films, dramas, music videos, web series, sports content, and live television—primarily in Bengali.

== List of Bangladeshi OTT Platforms ==
Below is a comprehensive list of OTT platforms developed, owned, and operated in Bangladesh:

Active and Notable Bangladeshi OTT Platforms
Name	Launch Year	Owner / Developer	Model	Content Focus	Note (Status)	Reference
Utshob	2026	Tiger Digitech Studios	Freemium	Movies, series, dramas, music	Active; offers Free, SVOD and TVOD services	Utshob
iScreen	2023	Impress Telefilm (Channel i)	Freemium	Films, cultural shows, series, stage plays	Active; cultural-heavy archive from Channel i	iScreen
DeeptoPlay	2022	Kazi Media (Deepto TV)	Freemium	Live Deepto TV, VOD shows	Active; premium & free content available	DeeptoPlay
Chorki	2021	Mediastar Ltd. (Transcom Group)	Freemium	Original Bangladeshi films, series, docs	Active; strong global user base	Chorki
Binge	2020	Robi Axiata (RedDot Digital)	Subscription	Live TV, web series, movies	Active; Binge Box device also available	Binge
Cinematic	2020	Live Technologies Ltd.	Subscription	Films, web series, live TV	Active; large content library	Cinematic
Toffee	2019	Banglalink	Freemium	Live TV, sports, user content, movies	Active; includes UGC monetization	Toffee
Bioscope	2016	Grameenphone	Freemium	Live TV, films, dramas, sports	Active; GP Prime content available	Bioscope Live
BanglaFlix	2016	Banglalink	Subscription	Movies, short dramas, music videos	Active but less promoted post-Toffee	Haier News
Bongo BD	2013	Bongo	Freemium	Dramas, films, music, originals	Active; one of the first OTTs in Bangladesh	Bongo BD
TeleFlix	2012	Teletalk Bangladesh Ltd.	Subscription	Short films, dramas, songs	Operational; government-owned initiative	Haier News

== Niche and Independent Platforms ==
These platforms cater to specific genres, experimental formats, or indie creators.

Independent and Niche Bangladeshi OTT Platforms
Name	Launch Year	Ownership	Model	Focus Area	Note (Status)	Reference
Lagvelki	~2021	Independent creators	Freemium	Short films, student work, indie web series	Active; limited scale and reach	Libanza Films
Aayna	Unknown	Independent	Freemium	Films, low-budget indie content	Active; emerging local creators	Libanza Films
CineSpot	Unknown	Indie collective	Freemium	Short experimental cinema	Sporadic releases	Libanza Films
BanglaFix	Unknown	Independent	Subscription	Dramas, telefilms, music videos	Possibly merged or inactive	Libanza Films
Addatimes (BD version)	~2020	LBC Media (Bangladesh)	Subscription	Bengali web series (local + Indian)	Active; localized content from India & Bangladesh	Desh24

== Comparison with International OTTs ==
While global platforms like Netflix, Amazon Prime, Disney+ Hotstar, ZEE5, Hulu and HBO Max are available in Bangladesh. They are not Bangladeshi-owned and are thus excluded from this list. However, some (e.g., Hoichoi) have added local payment options and feature Bangladeshi content.

== See also ==
- Cinema of Bangladesh
- Telecommunications in Bangladesh
- Digital Bangladesh
- Streaming television
