= T Sports =

Bangladesh's sports TV channel

- Country: Bangladesh
- Broadcast area: Nationwide
- Headquarters: Bashundhara Residential Area, Dhaka

Programming
- Languages: Bangla; English
- Picture format: 1080i HDTV (downscaled to letterboxed 576i for SDTV sets)

Ownership
- Owner: East West Media Group
- Key people: Ishtiaque Sadeque (CEO)
- Sister channels: News24

History
- Launched: 9 November 2020; 10 January 2021 (HD Channel)

Links
- Website: www.tsports.com

T Sports

YouTube information
- Channel: @TSportsbd
- Years active: 2020–present
- Subscribers: 5.09 million
- Views: 1.03 billion
- Last updated: 22 February 2025

T Sports, also referred to as Titas Sports, is a Bangladeshi Bengali-language sports oriented television channel owned by East West Media Group, a subsidiary of Bashundhara Group. It is Bangladesh's first television channel dedicated to sports programming. In addition, T Sports added a high definition channel called T Sports HD which was launched on 9 January 2021.

== History ==
In November 2013, the Bangladesh Telecommunication Regulatory Commission granted then state minister of liberation war affairs A. B. Tajul Islam–owned "Titas TV" a broadcasting license. Its frequency allocation was granted in May 2018. The channel was acquired by Bashundhara Group–owned East West Media Group from Millennium Media Limited; the channel was renamed "T Sports".

T Sports began broadcasting in late 2020, started with a televised football match between Bangladesh and Nepal on 9 November 2020. On the same day, it was announced that they would broadcast the Bangabandhu T20 Cup, a five-team Twenty20 cricket competition in Bangladesh. T Sports later began high-definition broadcasts on 10 January 2021. In August 2022, T Sports gained the rights of airing the 2022 FIFA World Cup to Bangladeshi audiences. T Sports launched its streaming app on 25 October 2022.

In February 2026, JioStar terminated its five-year sub-license broadcast and digital rights deal (2023–2027) with T Sports for the Indian Premier League (IPL) and Women's Premier League (WPL) with "immediate effect", citing continued payment defaults and unpaid dues for the 2025 season of IPL and WPL.

T Sports became the official Bangladeshi broadcaster of the 2026 FIFA World Cup along with Bangladesh Television and Somoy TV.

== Football Broadcasting Rights ==
Events	Host	Rights
Bangladesh-Nepal International Friendly Football Series	Bangladesh	2020
Premier League	England	2020–2021
Bangladesh Federation Cup	Bangladesh	2020–present
Bangladesh Premier League	Bangladesh	2021–present
Bangladesh Women's Football League	Bangladesh	2021–present
National School Football Championship (Final Match)	Bangladesh	2020
AFC Champions league	Asia	2021–present
Tri Nation Cup (Bangladesh, Nepal, Kyrgyzstan)	Nepal	2021
La Liga	Spain	2021–2022
AFC Cup (South Asia Zone)	Asia	2021–present
AFC World Cup Qualifiers	Asia	2021
FA Cup	England	2021–22
SAFF Championship	South Asia	2021– present
Independence Cup	Bangladesh	2021– present
SAFF U-20 Women's Championship	Bangladesh	2021
Bangabandhu Sheikh Mujibur Rahman Gold Cup U-17	Bangladesh	2021
Bangamata Sheikh Fazilatunnesa Mujib Gold Cup U-17	Bangladesh	2021
BGMEA Cup	Bangladesh	2022
UEFA Euro	Europe	2024
Copa América	South America	2021– present
FIFA U-20 Women's World Cup	Costa Rica	2022
SAFF Women's Championship(Final)	Nepal	2022
AFC U17 Asian Cup Qualifiers	Bangladesh	2022
FIFA U-17 Women's World Cup	India	2022
FIFCO World Corporate Champions Cup	United Arab Emirates	2022
FIFA World cup (along with GTV)	Qatar	2022
FIFA Women's World Cup (along with GTV)	Australia and New Zealand	2023
Scottish Premiership(Celtic F.C. matches only)	Scotland	2023–24
SAFF Women's Championship	India	2026
FIFA World Cup (along with Somoy TV & BTV)	USA Canada And Mexico	2026

== Cricket Broadcasting Rights ==
=== Leagues and Domestic Tournaments ===
Leagues	Country	Seasons
Bangabandhu T20 Cup	Bangladesh	2020
Lanka Premier League	Sri Lanka	2020– Present
Mymensingh Premier League	Bangladesh	2020
Bijoy Dibosh Bangabandhu T20 Narail Cup Final	Bangladesh	2020–2021
Bangladesh Premier League (along with Gazi TV)	Bangladesh	2021–present
Pakistan Super League	Pakistan	2021–present
T10 League	UAE	2021–present
Corporate T20 Cricket Tournament	Bangladesh	2021
Road Safety World Series	India	2020–2021
2021 Dhaka Premier Division Twenty20 Cricket League	Bangladesh	2021
The Hundred	England and Wales	2021
Indian Premier League	India	2021–2025
Dhaka Premier Division Cricket League (One day)	Bangladesh	2022
Fairbreak Invitational T20 Tournament	UAE	2022
Indoor Uni Cricket (Indoor Cricket)	Bangladesh	2022
National School Cricket (Final)	Bangladesh	2022– present
Sharebazar Corporate Cricket (T10 Friendly Cricket Match)	Bangladesh	2022
Minor League Cricket(Final & Semi-finals)	USA	2022
Atlanta Open T20	USA	2022
Women's Premier League	India	2023
Zim Afro T10	Zimbabwe	2023
Global T20 Canada	Canada	2023
US Masters T10 League	United States	2023
Caribbean Premier League	Caribbean	2023

=== International Tournaments ===
Tournament	Host	Year
2020–21 Nepal Tri-Nation Series	Nepal	2021
Bangabandhu Four Nation Physically Challenged T20 (Bangladesh, India, Sri Lanka, Nepal)	Bangladesh	2022
ICC Men's T20 World Cup (along with GTV)		2021, 2022
Asia Cup		2023
ICC Champions Trophy 2025 (along with Nagorik TV)	Pakistan	2025

=== National Team Rights ===
National Team	Format	Duration
Bangladesh (along with GTV)	Test, One Day, T20	2020– present
International cricket in India	Test, One Day, T20	2021–2025

== Other Broadcasting Rights ==
=== Kabaddi ===
Events	Host	Rights
Bangabandhu Services Kabaddi	Bangladesh	2020
National Women's Kabaddi	Bangladesh	2020
Bangabandhu Cup	Bangladesh	2021–present
1st Division Kabaddi League	Bangladesh	2021
Women's Kabaddi League	Bangladesh	2021
Victory Day Kabaddi	Bangladesh	2021
IGP National Youth Kabaddi Cup	Bangladesh	2021
PKL	India	2022

=== Volleyball ===
Events	Host	Rights
Bangabandhu & Bangamata Asian Central Zone Volleyball Challenge Cup	Bangladesh	2021

=== Weightlifting ===
Events	Host	Rights
BABBF	Bangladesh	2020

=== Boxing ===
Events	Host	Year
South Asian Pro Boxing Fight Night:The Ultimate Glory	Bangladesh	2022
XCEL Boxing Championship	Bangladesh	2023

=== Hockey ===
Events	Host	Year
Bangladesh National Women's Hockey Championship	Bangladesh	2020
Walton Women's Hockey Series	Bangladesh	2021
HCT	Bangladesh	2022

=== 3×3 Basketball ===
Events	Host	Year
Chatto 3v3 Basketball	Bangladesh	2022

=== Badminton ===
Events	Host	Year
Bangabandhu Birth Centenary Badminton Ranking Tournament	Bangladesh	2020
2nd Corporate Badminton Tournament	Bangladesh	2021
Badminton Stars Challenge	Bangladesh	2022
Bashundhara Kings Winter Badminton Carnival	Bangladesh	2023

=== Kickboxing ===
Promotion	Year
BKK Kickboxing Championship	2022

=== Tennis ===
Event	Host	Year
Independence Day National Tennis Tournament(Final)	Bangladesh	2022

=== Athletics ===
Event	Host	Year
World Athletics Continental Tour(Gold)	International	2023

=== Multi-Sports Events ===
Event	Host	Year	Sports	Note
BIUSC	Bangladesh	2022	Cricket, Football, Basketball, Badminton, Swimming, Kabaddi, Chess, Table Tennis, Cycling, Marathon etc.	Inter University Sports Tournament

=== Cycling ===
Event	Races	Host	Year
UCI World Tour	Tour de Suisse	Switzerland	2023
UCI World Tour	Tour de Pologne	Poland	2023

=== Other sports ===
Event	Sport	Host	Year
Bangabandhu 7th National Arm-Wrestling (Final)	Arm wrestling	Bangladesh	2021
Nouka Baich on the occasion of PM's Birthday	Nouka Baich	Bangladesh	2021
Dhaka Marathon	Marathon	Bangladesh	2022
Corporate 8 Ball Championship	8 ball	Bangladesh	2023

== Sports-related shows ==
Show	Sport
Sports Punch	All
Let's Play	eSports
IPL Tidbits	Cricket
Straight Drive	Cricket
Hawk Eye	Cricket
Ultra Edge	Cricket
The Football Show	Football
Added Time	Football
Touchline	Football

== See also ==
- List of television stations in Bangladesh
- News24 (owned by Bashundhara Group)
