= Bangladesh Kabaddi Stadium =

Stadium in Paltan, Dhaka, Bangladesh

- বাংলাদেশ কাবাডি স্টেডিয়াম
- Interactive map of Bangladesh Kabaddi Stadium
- Full name: Bangladesh Kabaddi Stadium
- Address: Paltan, Dhaka, Bangladesh
- Coordinates: 23°43′30.30″N 90°24′50.0″E
- Owner: National Sports Council
- Operator: Bangladesh Kabaddi Federation

Construction
- Opened: 2010

Tenants
- Bangladesh Kabaddi Federation, Bangladesh men's team, Bangladesh women's team

Bangladesh Kabaddi Stadium (also known as National Kabaddi Stadium) is a stadium built in 2010 exclusively for hosting kabaddi competitions. It is located next to the Shaheed Nur Hossain National Volleyball Stadium inside the Bangabandhu National Stadium Complex in Paltan, Dhaka. Kabaddi league and various competitions are organized here. Sports facilities are also built and under the supervision of the National Sports Council. The headquarters of Bangladesh Kabaddi Federation is located here. The organization also maintains the stadium.

In addition to the central Kabaddi court area, offices, there are spectator seating galleries, gymnasiums for players, and separate accommodation for male and female players. The stadium is used for local kabaddi leagues, the Bangladesh national kabaddi men's and women's teams, various national team practices and local competitions.

== See also ==
- Stadiums in Bangladesh
