= England Kabaddi Federation UK =

Governing body for kabaddi in the UK

The England Kabaddi Federation UK is the governing body for kabaddi in the United Kingdom. It also governs the UK Kabaddi league. The UK Kabaddi league hosts 18 Kabaddi clubs. It also plays host to 13 Kabaddi tournaments and 1 international Kabaddi Cup, 2013 UK Kabaddi Cup. Players compete in the league from the United Kingdom, India, Pakistan, Canada and the United States.

== Clubs ==
1. Singh Sabha London East Sports Club Barking

2. Coventry Asian Sports Federation

3. Guru Arjan Dev Gurdawara Derby Kabaddi Club

4. Erith & Woolwich Kabaddi Club

5. Guru Nanak Kabaddi Club Gravesend

6. Hayes Kabaddi Club

7. Guru Nanak Sports Club Hull & London

8. Leicester Kabaddi Club

9. Medway Kabaddi Club

10. Singh Sabha Kabaddi Club Slough

11. GNG Kabaddi Club Smethwick

12. Singh Sabha Sports Club Southall

13. Telford Kabaddi Club

14. Sikh Temple Kabaddi Club Walsall

15. Punjab United Kabaddi Club Wolverhampton

16. Sikh Temple Kabaddi Club Wolverhampton

17. Hounslow Kabaddi Club

18. Swansea Kabaddi Club

== Famous England Players ==
- Manga Mithapuria is a Kabaddi superstar raider who competes nationally for England
- Jeeti Kooner is a Kabaddi superstar stopper who competes nationally for England. He won best stopper at the 2013 Canada World Kabaddi Cup.
