= Poland national kabaddi team =

Poland
- Association: Kabaddi Federation of Poland
- Confederation: International Kabaddi Federation (IKF)
- Head Coach: Satish Siwach
- Captain: Michał Śpiczko
- Most caps: Michał Śpiczko

World Cup
- 1 (first in 2016)
- Group stage (2016)

Kabaddi World Cup
- 1 (first in 2025)
- Quarterfinals (2025)

European Championship
- 3 (first in 2019)
- 1st (2019, 2021, 2023)
Medal record
| Event | 1st | 2nd | 3rd |
|---|---|---|---|
| European Championship | 3 | 0 | 0 |
| European Beach Championship | 1 | 0 | 0 |
| Total | 4 | 0 | 0 |

The Poland national kabaddi team represents the country of Poland in international kabaddi competitions. Most recently, Poland won the European Championships 2019 in Glasgow defeating Holland in the finals 48-27 under the captaincy of Michal Spiczko.

== Tournament history ==
=== Standard kabaddi ===
==== World Cup (IKF) ====
World Cup
| Year | Rank | M | W | D | L | PF | PA | PD |
|---|---|---|---|---|---|---|---|---|
| (India) 2004 | Didn’t Participate | | | | | | | |
| (India) 2007 | Didn’t Participate | | | | | | | |
| (India) 2016 | Group stage | 5 | 2 | 0 | 3 | 137 | 155 | −18 |
| (India) 2025 | TBD | | | | | | | |
| Total | 1/4 | 5 | 2 | 0 | 3 | 137 | 155 | −18 |

==== World Cup (World Kabaddi) ====
Kabaddi World Cup
| Year | Rank | M | W | D | L | PF | PA | PD |
|---|---|---|---|---|---|---|---|---|
| (Malaysia) 2019 | Didn’t Participate | | | | | | | |
| (England) 2025 | Quarter-final | 4 | 2 | 0 | 2 | 129 | 101 | +28 |
| Total | 1/2 | 4 | 2 | 0 | 2 | 129 | 101 | +28 |

==== Euproean Kabaddi Championship ====
European Kabaddi Championship
| Year | Rank | M | W | D | L | PF | PA | PD |
|---|---|---|---|---|---|---|---|---|
| (Scotland) 2019 | Champions | 5 | 5 | 0 | 0 | 134 | 99 | +35 |
| (Cyprus) 2021 | Champions | 4 | 4 | 0 | 0 | 122 | 95 | +27 |
| (Italy) 2023 | Champions | 4 | 4 | 0 | 0 | 129 | 101 | +28 |
| Total | 3/3 | 13 | 13 | 0 | 0 | 385 | 295 | +90 |

== Current squad ==
| Player | Role |
|---|---|
| Michał Śpiczko (Captain) | All-rounder |
| Ronil Patni | All-rounder |
| Paweł Śpiczko | All-rounder |
| Dawid Więckowski | Raider |
| Hubert Kulik | Raider |
| Gabriel Łaskowski | Raider |
| Anton Chmielow | Raider |
| Damian Łuc | Raider |
| Arek Górski | Raider |
| Grzegorz Franków | Left‑cover (Defender) |
| Gabriel Ledniowski | Right‑cover (Defender) |
| Edward Sucharda | Right‑corner (Defender) |
| Bartosz Sujata | Left‑corner (Defender) |
| Krzysztof Sawicki | Defender |

== Coaching staff ==
| Role | Name |
|---|---|
| Head coach | (India) Satish Siwach |
| Team manager | (Poland) Maciej Sawicki |

== International grounds ==
Locations of stadiums which have hosted international kabaddi matches in Poland

| Stadium | City | Voivodeship | Capacity | Matches hosted | Notes |
|---|---|---|---|---|---|
| Arena Ursynów | Warsaw | Masovian Voivodeship | 2,000 | European Kabaddi Championship, Friendly matches | One of Poland’s primary venues for kabaddi; hosted European events |
| Ergo Arena | Gdańsk/Sopot | Pomeranian Voivodeship | 11,000 | Friendly matches, promotional events | Multi-purpose arena occasionally used for kabaddi exhibitions |
