= Paltan =

Thana in Dhaka South City Corporation, Bangladesh

Paltan Model Thana পল্টন মডেল থানা
- Thana
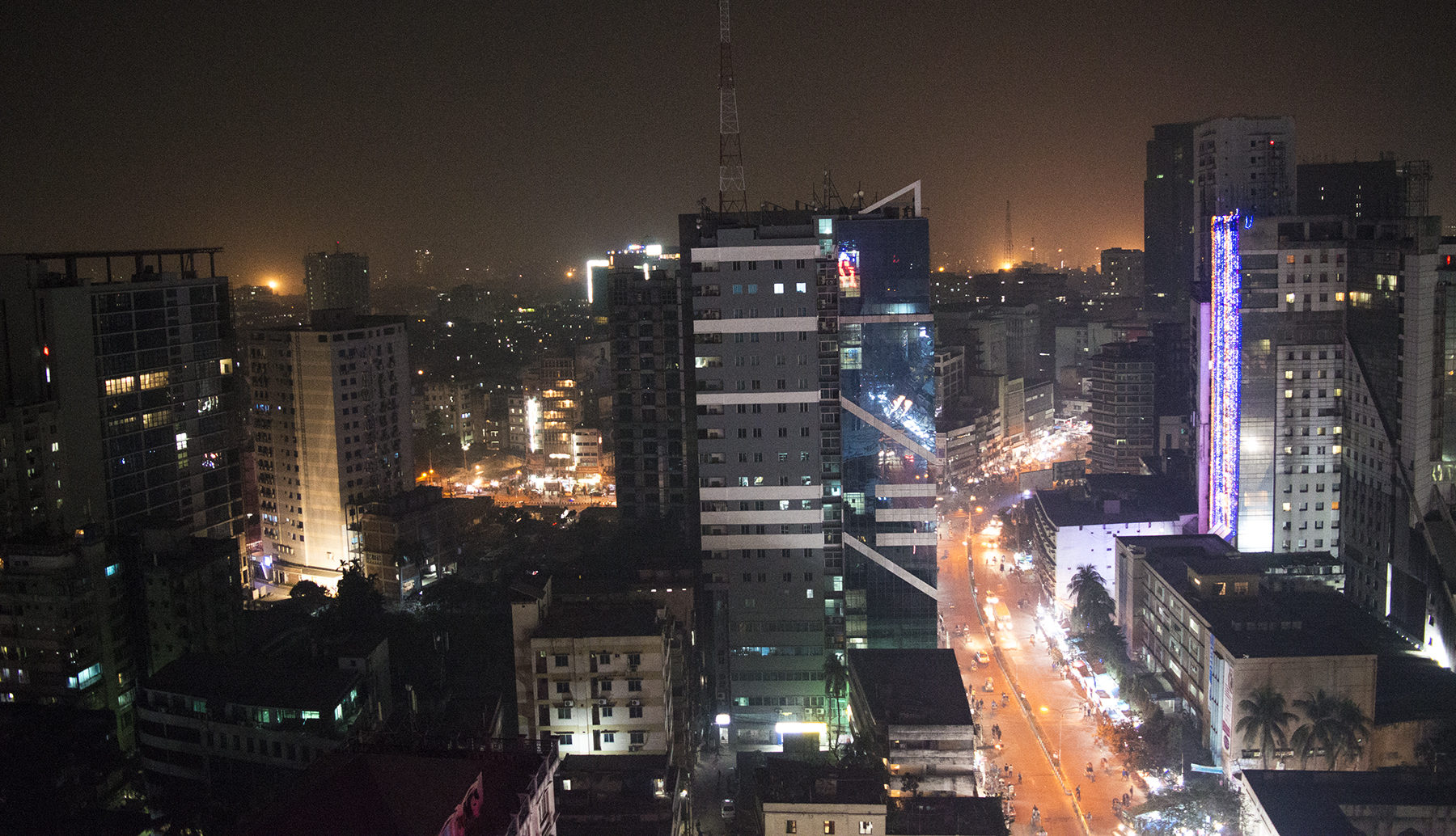
- Skyline of Paltan, Dhaka, Bangladesh
- Expandable map of vicinity of Paltan Thana
- Location of Paltan within Dhaka Location of Paltan within Dhaka Division Location of Thana within Bangladesh
- Coordinates: 23.7362°N 90.4142°E
- Country: Bangladesh
- Division: Dhaka Division
- District: Dhaka District
- Established as a thana: 2005

Area
  - Total: 1.42 km^{2} (0.55 sq mi)
- Elevation: 23 m (75 ft)

Population (2022)
  - Total: 53,914
  - Density: 41,999/km^{2} (108,780/sq mi)
- Time zone: UTC+6 (BST)
- Postal code: 1000
- Area code: 02

Paltan is a thana (precinct) of Dhaka, the capital of Bangladesh. It is often said to be the center of Dhaka, dividing "Old Dhaka" and "New Dhaka". Paltan was made a thana in 2005 by then Prime Minister Begum Khaleda Zia. Paltan Thana was formed on 27 June 2005 comprising part of Motijheel thana.

== History ==
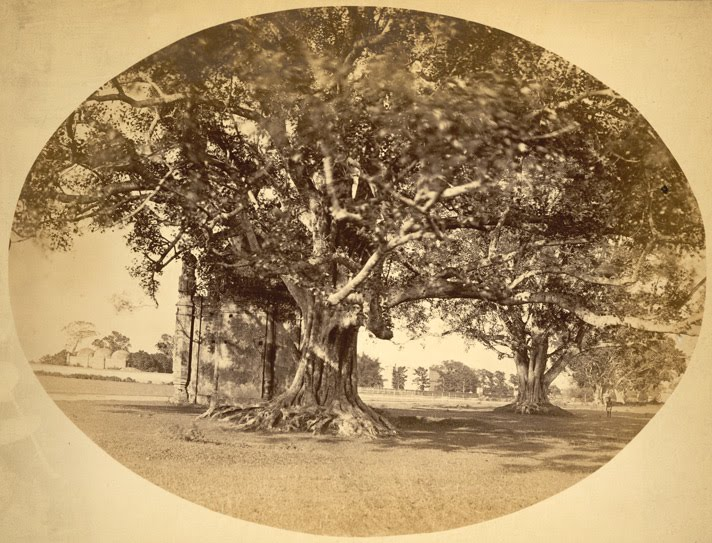
Photo taken 1875 by an unknown photographer, shows a small mosque beside a tree on the Purana Paltan Maidan

The name Paltan came from a cantonment of the British East India Company. The name was derived from the English word platoon, but in reality a size of battalion or regiment. Starting from Gulistan area, Purana Paltan, Purana Paltan Lane, Naya Paltan, Topkhana and up to Fulbaria rail-line, it was the cantonment of the East India Company and there were artillery forces in Topkhana. 'Top' means cannon and Topkhana means armoury. It is a Turkish word. In the year 1840 the cantonment was transferred to Ramna, Begunbari, then to Lalbagh Fort. After the First war of Indian Independence in 1857 (sepoy mutiny according to the British Raj) in 1857 the Cantonment was shifted to Mill Barrack. After the transfer of the cantonment the area was given to the municipality to be taken care of. From the whole area they took a part and made a garden which was known as "Company Bagicha". There was a big field in the rest part, which was used by the student of Dhaka College as their playground. Beside this it was used as the Parade Ground of Lt. Governor. But end of the 19th century it was used as the cricket field and sometimes the public meetings took place over here.

Meanwhile, in 1895, due to the growth of football among Bengalis in the Bengal Presidency, the Dhaka Sporting Association (DSA) was formed in a small tin house on an unoccupied field. It also served as the practice grounds for Dhaka's three biggest clubs at the time: Wari Club, Victoria SC, and Lakshibazar Club. The clubs divided the field into thirds according to their own preferences.

Prior to the partition of India, Paltan served as the main practice ground for the Dacca football team, which represented Dacca (present-day Dhaka).

Up to 1930, very few people lived in Paltan. Buddhadeva Bose's novella 'Moner Moto Meye' is evocative of this period; the character Bikash says "When I was 17 years old, I came to a house in Paltan. At that time there were only three houses in that area".

Paltan has boasted numerous noted personalities and families since its beginning. The Gazis, Abedins, Chowdhurys and Roufs were among the families who settled during the early 19th century. These families played a major role in development of the city as a whole.

== Geography ==
Paltan is located at 23.7362°N 90.4142°E. Its total area is 1.42 km^{2}.

== Demographics ==
Religions in Paltan Thana (2022)
Religion	Percent
Islam	94.87%
Hinduism	4.84%
Other or not stated	0.29%

According to the 2022 Bangladeshi census, Paltan Thana had 12,313 households and a population of 53,914. 4.91% of the population were under 5 years of age. Paltan had a literacy rate (age 7 and over) of 94.22%: 95.54% for males and 92.39% for females, and a sex ratio of 135.06 males for every 100 females.

According to 2011 Census of Bangladesh, Paltan Thana has a population of 59,639 with average household size of 5.7 members, and an average literacy rate of 83.0% vs national average of 51.8% literacy.

== Features ==
VIP Road- In Paltan area there is an inner-circular VIP road (now named as Anjuman-e- Mufidul Islam road, Shahid-Manik road), which is 120 feet wide divided by a divider. The road is named so because it's the pathway for all VIP's starting from the Prime minister and President of the country to most business tycoons. This road is Adjacent to Motijheel, the countries business capital area which includes principal branches of nearly all the banks and other financial organizations along with the corporate offices of most of the companies. The stock Exchange of Dhaka is also located at the same area.

Police Station-The model police station "Paltan Thana" is located in Paltan. People can obtain help from police at any time. There is a big police quarter inside the police station. Around 200 police force stays here, including female police.

Community Centers- Ananda Bhaban and Paltan Community Center in this area are well known community centers in the city

Mosques and other places of worship- Dhaka is known as the city of mosques. Numerous mosques are located in this area. 'Baitul Mukarram', the national mosque, is located in this Zone. Naya Paltan Jame masjid, Purana Paltan mosque, Purana Paltan Lane Bot-tola mosque are amongst others to be mentioned. Most of these mosques were built during the earlier decades of the last century. The Archbishop house known as the Kakrail Church, one of the oldest and biggest churches in the city, is located near Paltan.

Siddheshwari Kali Mandir, one of the major sacred places for the Hindus is also situated near this area apart from many others.

Shopping Complexes- Paltan, being one of the oldest areas in the city, boasts numerous shopping centers and markets. Baitul Mukarram, Polwel super Market, Paltan Super Market, City heart, Gazi Bhaban and many other centers are situated in the area.

=== Sports ===
Professional football is played at the National Stadium. The stadium complex also includes the Bangladesh Kabaddi Stadium and venues for boxing, field hockey, handball, gymnastics, roller skating, and volleyball.

== Administration ==
Paltan has 2 Wards (Wards-36, 56), 13 Mahallas and 1 Police Station.

== Notable residents ==
Starting from the British period till today numerous noted individuals have lived in the greater Paltan. Amongst them Great Political and social reformer; Philanthropist Alhajj Abdul Halim Chowdhury, Noted Industrialist Mr. Nurunnabi Gazi, Printing and Packaging pioneer Mr. Mohammed Hussain, Aga Khani industrialist Mr. Mohammad Bhai, Veteran Politician Gazi Golam Mostafa, Central Commerce Minister of Pakistan Mr. Wahiduzzaman, Lawyer Adv. Ashraf Ali Chowdhury, Adv Golam Morshed, Pakistan's Hilal-i-Quaid, first editor of Dawn and Central Industry Minister of Pakistan back in 1965 Altaf Husain's brother Censor Board Chairman Anwar Husain and his wife Media personality and daughter of renowned Bollywood Actor Pahari Sanyal.

== Naya Paltan ==
There is a history of the naming of Naya Paltan. Before the 1950s this area presently named as Naya Paltan was called Ramkrishnapur. There were hardly 25 families residing in the two lanes of the area. One lane is through to Purana Paltan. The other lane was blind having less than 10 families. In 1952 (year of Language Movement of 1952) the residents (Including Dr. Abdul Halim, Md. Rajab Ali, Md. Zohad Hossain, and others) of the area (Then Ramkrishnapur) sat together in several occasions to change the name of the area. The reason was, after partition of 1947 all the original owners of the area sold their houses and migrated to India and new owners populated and developed the area. The first proposal was to change the name from Ramkrishnapur to Allahrasulpur. In subsequent meetings this proposal did not get sufficient support. The second proposal was Naya Paltan. Immediately, this proposal was seconded and supported by all.

== Purana Paltan ==
Under British rule, the Government maintained a regiment of soldiers here and hence it got the name Purana Paltan. In this spot the Army had a firing range. During 1956 there were fewer buildings in Purana Paltan and it was surrounded by villages on the east and north, and a vast empty space to the south. Now there's hardly any open place. This is an old Dhaka Landmark. At present it is famous for publishing houses. Recently it got popularity for large number of travel agency being shifted to Purana Paltan.
