= 2025 Kabaddi World Cup (International Kabaddi Federation) =

Tournament information
- Administrator: International Kabaddi Federation
- Format: Standard style
- Tournament format(s): Round-robin and Knockout
- Host: India

The 2025 Kabaddi World Cup was an announced plan for an event that was to be held in January 2025 but was indefinitely postponed. It was to be the fourth edition of the men's Kabaddi World Cup organised by the International Kabaddi Federation (IKF). It was announced in April 2024 that it would be hosted in India in January 2025, though it was later reported in January 2025 that it might take place later in the year, possibly in Bangladesh.

== History ==
This would have been the first IKF World Cup edition after the COVID-19 pandemic. Like the three previous editions of the IKF men's World Cup, it was expected to take place in India. The previous IKF men's World Cup events were held in 2004 in Mumbai, in 2007 in Panvel, and in 2016 in Ahmedabad.

== Broadcasting ==
Star Sports was planned to be the host broadcaster of the tournament.

Countries	Broadcaster
India	Star Sports
