= Sony India =

Indian subsidiary of Japan's Sony corporation

Sony India Private Limited
- Type: Subsidiary
- Industry: Entertainment; Television
- Founded: 17 November 1994; 31 years ago
- Headquarters: New Delhi, India
- Key people: Masaru Tamagawa, Gaurav Banerjee (CEO)
- Parent: Sony Corporation
- Website: sony.co.in

Sony India Pvt. Ltd., is the Indian subsidiary of Japan's Sony Corporation, based in New Delhi.

Sony's principal Indian businesses include marketing, sales and after-sales service of electronic products & software exports.

In India, Sony has its footprint across all major cities and towns in the country through a distribution network of over 20,000 dealers and distributors, 300 exclusive Sony outlets and 25 direct branch locations. Moreover, Sony's 19 sales branches cover a total of 450 cities. It has also developed a network of 270 Sony Center and established 30 warehouses across the country to manage its supply chain effectively.

In January 2024, Sony India terminated its proposed merger with Zee Entertainment Enterprises, citing unmet financial conditions. In August 2024, both companies agreed to settle their legal disputes, withdrawing all claims against each other with no continuing obligations.

== Sony India Software Centre ==
Established in 1997, Sony India Software Center (SISC) serves as a development base for software used in a range of products manufactured by Sony Group companies around the world and as the Group’s global offshore IT centre. In fiscal year 2010, which ended March 31, 2011, SISC had approximately 1,000 engineers on staff. Work conducted at SISC included 3D technologies, Sony Internet TV, Sony Tablet, and Android-based mobile phones and other devices. As the Group’s strategic offshore IT center, it worked together with Sony Group companies to support the Group’s operating foundation.

In early 2012, Sony Corp restructured its India business by creating two separate units, one for undertaking sales and marketing operations, headquartered at New Delhi and the other for focusing on software and product development based in Bengaluru. As a result, Sony India Software Centre Pvt. Ltd. was de-merged from Sony India Pvt. Ltd. as a separate entity aiming at more effective operations.

== Broadcasting and sports ==
In November 2024, Sony India secured exclusive broadcasting rights for all Asian Cricket Council (ACC) tournaments until 2031, valued at approximately $170 million.

In April 2024, Formula E and Sony India entered into a three-year exclusive media partnership. Sony Sports Network and SonyLIV stream all Formula E races live in India.

== Market presence ==
For the 2024 Onam season, Sony India targeted ₹150 crore in sales in Kerala, an increase from ₹100 crore in 2023. The focus was on promoting premium products through the "Cinema is Coming Home" campaign.
