= British Kabaddi League =

The British Kabaddi League (BKL) is a professional kabaddi league that occurs annually in Britain, with the first edition occurring in 2022. The league is hosted by the English Kabaddi Association and Scottish Kabaddi Association.

== History ==
The BKL was started to encourage kabaddi across the United Kingdom and among the South Asian community; it follows in the wake of other initiatives to promote kabaddi in Britain, such as the showing of kabaddi on Channel 4 in the 1990s. It was also started to capitalise on the tourism boost caused by the 2022 Commonwealth Games. There are plans to expand the number of teams in the league and start a women's edition.

== Format ==
The competition takes place over four weekends, with each weekend's competition taking place in a different city.

== Teams ==
There are ten teams in the league, up from eight in the 2022 edition: Birmingham Bulls, Wolverhampton Wolfpack, Walsall Hunters, Leicester Warriors, Edinburgh Eagles, Glasgow Unicorns, Harrow Heroes, Luton Bengal Tigers, Nottingham Royals and Manchester Raiders.

== Results ==
=== 2022 season ===
In the 2022 season, the following playoff results occurred:

Semi-final 1: Birmingham Bulls beat the Manchester Raiders 44-33

Semi-final 2: Glasgow Unicorns beat the London Lions 33-31

Third-place playoff: Manchester Raiders beat the London Lions 52-51

British Kabaddi League Final: Birmingham Bulls beat the Glasgow Unicorns 48-18

== See also ==
- Kabaddi in the United Kingdom
- Pro Kabaddi League
