= 2019 Kabaddi World Cup (World Kabaddi) =

Tournament of the sport of Kabaddi

- Official logo of the Kabaddi World cup 2019

Tournament information
- Dates: 20–28 July 2019
- Administrator: Host: Malaysia Kabaddi Federation (MKF); Sanctioned by: World Kabaddi
- Format: Standard style
- Tournament format(s): Round-robin and Knockout
- Host: Malaysia
- Venue: Dewan Bistari, Melaka
- Participants: 8 teams (Men's); 4 teams (Women's)
- Website: https://worldcupkabaddi.org/

Final positions
- Champions: India (Men's); India (Women's)
- 1st runners-up: Iraq (Men's); Chinese Taipei (Women's)
- 2nd runners-up: Chinese Taipei (Men's); Malaysia (Women's)

The 2019 Kabaddi World Cup was the inaugural National (Asian) style tournament held by World Kabaddi. It was originally scheduled to be contested from 2 to 15 April 2019 in Melaka, Malaysia. However, the tournament was postponed and held from July 20–28 with fewer teams participating.

Competition was held for both the men and women's categories. Powerhouse India became double champions, grabbing both the titles at stake.

The COVID-19 pandemic began after this 2019 event, and World Kabaddi did not hold any additional "World Cup" events until the March 2025 event in West Midlands, England.

== Organization ==
World Kabaddi, formed in 2018, organised this event in 2019. Due to sponsorship and other technical issues, the tournament had to be postponed from April to July of the same year, with a reduced number of participating teams.

The tournament was hosted by the Malaysia Kabaddi Federation (MKF) and was officially launched by the governor of the Melaka state, Dr Mohd Khalil Yaakob, on November 17, 2018.

Present at the launch with Mohd Khalil at the Temasek Hotel in Ujong Pasir were World Kabaddi Vice-President Jagjit Singh and State Health and Anti Drug Committee Chairman Low Chee Leong.

The Melaka State Malaysian Indian Youth Council (MYIC) and the Melaka State Malaysian Youth Council were the youth organisations that were also supporters of the event.

== Theme song ==
Composer Balanraj from Malaysia penned the theme song for the event. Music Arrangements were made by M. Jagathees with Sound Engineering by Boy Ragde and the Song Lyrics and Vocals by Vinz.

== Men's competition ==
=== Preliminary round ===
Team	Pld	W	D	L	SF	SA	SD	Qualification
India	7	7	0	0	0	0	0	Advanced to the knockout phase
Iraq	7	5	0	2	0	0	0	Advanced to the knockout phase
Malaysia	7	5	0	2	0	0	0	Advanced to the knockout phase
Chinese Taipei	7	5	0	2	0	0	0	Advanced to the knockout phase
Australia	7	3	0	4	0	0	0	
Hong Kong	7	1	0	6	0	0	0	
Norway	7	1	0	6	0	0	0	
New Zealand	7	1	0	6	0	0	0	

July 21, 2019

Chinese Taipei	76–25	Australia

July 21, 2019

Iraq	56–30	Malaysia

July 21, 2019

New Zealand	73–42	Hong Kong

July 22, 2019

India	105–15	Norway

July 22, 2019

Chinese Taipei	66–25	New Zealand

July 22, 2019

Malaysia	104–20	Hong Kong

July 22, 2019

Australia	66–49	Norway

July 22, 2019

India	68–26	Iraq

July 22, 2019

Malaysia	40–39	Chinese Taipei

July 23, 2019

Iraq	94–24	Norway

July 23, 2019

Australia	69–45	New Zealand

July 23, 2019

India	74–23	Hong Kong

July 23, 2019

Norway	62–50	New Zealand

July 23, 2019

Iraq	83–19	Hong Kong

July 23, 2019

Malaysia	78–34	Australia

July 23, 2019

India	66–31	Chinese Taipei

July 24, 2019

Hong Kong	58–56	Norway

July 24, 2019

Malaysia	89–37	New Zealand

July 24, 2019

Iraq	48–84	Chinese Taipei

July 24, 2019

Malaysia	27–0 (walkover)	Norway

July 24, 2019

Chinese Taipei	76–16	Hong Kong

July 24, 2019

India	73–22	Australia

July 25, 2019

Chinese Taipei	27–0 (walkover)	Norway

July 25, 2019

India	27–0 (walkover)	New Zealand

July 25, 2019

Iraq	53–19	Australia

July 26, 2019

India	84–19	Malaysia

July 26, 2019

Australia	58–32	Hong Kong

July 26, 2019

Iraq	82–14	New Zealand

=== Semi-finals ===
July 26, 2019

India	73–26	Chinese Taipei

July 26, 2019

Iraq	60–33	Malaysia

=== 3rd place match ===
July 27, 2019

Chinese Taipei	45–21	Malaysia

=== Final ===
July 27, 2019

India	57–27	Iraq

== Women's competition ==
=== Preliminary round ===
Team	Pld	W	D	L	SF	SA	SD	Qualification
India	3	3	0	0	0	0	0	Advanced to the knockout phase
Chinese Taipei	3	2	0	1	0	0	0	Advanced to the knockout phase
Malaysia	3	1	0	2	0	0	0	Advanced to the knockout phase
Hong Kong	3	0	0	3	0	0	0	Advanced to the knockout phase

July 22, 2019

India	50–23	Chinese Taipei

July 23, 2019

Malaysia	74–23	Hong Kong

July 24, 2019

India	59–23	Malaysia

July 25, 2019

India	61–20	Hong Kong

July 25, 2019

Chinese Taipei	66–18	Malaysia

July 25, 2019

Chinese Taipei	68–20	Hong Kong

=== Semi-finals ===
July 27, 2019

India	71–33	Hong Kong

July 27, 2019

Chinese Taipei	71–22	Malaysia

=== 3rd place match ===
July 28, 2019

Malaysia	53–26	Hong Kong

=== Final ===
July 28, 2019

India	47–29	Chinese Taipei

== Awards ==
=== Men ===
- Best Raider: (Iraq) Ali Sari
- Best Defensive Player: (India) Sachin
- Best Player: (India) Amarjeet Singh

=== Women ===
- Best Raider: (India) Suman
- Best Defensive Player: (Malaysia) Malarvili Balaraman
- Best Player: (Chinese Taipei) Ren Ming Qin

== See also ==
- 2025 Kabaddi World Cup (World Kabaddi)
