= Bangladesh Kabaddi Federation =

National federation for kabaddi in Bangladesh

- Formation: 1973
- Headquarters: Dhaka, Bangladesh
- Location: Bangladesh Kabaddi Stadium
- Region served: Bangladesh
- Official language: Bengali
- President: Baharul Alam
- General Secretary: S M Nawaz Shohag
- Affiliations: International Kabaddi Federation

Bangladesh Kabaddi Federation is the national federation for Kabaddi and is responsible for governing the sport in Bangladesh. Baharul Alam, Inspector General of Bangladesh Police, is the President of Bangladesh Kabaddi Federation and General secretary is S M Nawaz Shohag.

== History ==
Bangladesh Kabaddi Federation was established in 1973 as the Bangladesh Amateur Kabadi Federation. It held the first international match against India in 1974, during which the Bangladesh team was coached by Sheikh Shaheb Ali. In 1978, it joined the Asian Amateur Kabadi Federation as a founding member. The 1990 Asian Games were the first to have Kabaddi in them. Bangladesh Kabaddi Federation organizes the National Kabadi Competition.

== See also ==
- Bangladesh national kabaddi team
