= 2016 Kabaddi World Cup (International Kabaddi Federation) =

International kabaddi tournament in India

Tournament information
- Dates: 7 October 2016–22 October 2016
- Administrator: International Kabaddi Federation; Government of Gujarat
- Format: Standard style
- Tournament format(s): Round-robin and Knockout
- Host: India
- Venue(s): The Arena, Ahmedabad
- Participants: 12

Final positions
- Champions: India (3rd title)
- 1st runners-up: Iran
- 2nd runners-up: South Korea; Thailand

Tournament statistics
- Matches played: 33
- Best Raider: (India) Ajay Thakur (64 points)
- Best Defender: (India) PO Surjeet Singh (23 points)

The 2016 Kabaddi World Cup was the third edition of the men's Kabaddi World Cup organised by the International Kabaddi Federation and contested from 7 to 22 October 2016 in Ahmedabad, India. Twelve countries competed in the tournament. India won their 3rd World Cup by defeating Iran 38–29 in the final.

== Participating countries ==
Team	Captain
Australia	Campbell Brown
Bangladesh	Md. Aruduzzaman Munshi
England	Someshwar Kaila
India	Anup Kumar
Iran	Meraj Sheykh
Japan	Masayuki Shimokawa
Kenya	David Mosambayi
Poland	Michał Śpiczko
South Korea	Dong Ju Hong
Thailand	Khomsan Thongkam
Argentina	Cesaro Roman
United States	Troy Bacon

Twelve teams competed in the tournament. Pakistan was originally scheduled to participate in the tournament, but was removed due to increased tensions between India and Pakistan. The International Kabaddi Federation argued that it was "not the right time to engage with Pakistan". The Pakistani team criticized the move, arguing that it was comparable to holding a FIFA World Cup without Brazil.

== Venue ==
The tournament was hosted at The Arena (currently known as The Arena by TransStadia, pending the sale of official naming rights), a newly constructed convertible stadium in Ahmedabad. In its standard configuration, it operates as an outdoor football pitch capable of seating 20,000. The venue utilizes technology licensed from the British firm StadiArena, which allows a portion of the field to be partitioned into a 4,000-seat indoor arena, which is used for the tournament. The venue is a public-private partnership with India's Department of Tourism

== Marketing ==
=== Emblem ===
The official emblem of the tournament was unveiled on 14 September 2016 by Minister of Youth Affairs and Sports Vijay Goel. It incorporates a stylized lion, representing the Asiatic lions of Girnar. The use of a lion symbolizes the "ferocity of a Kabaddi defender and the agility of a raider", while its striped mane represents the worldwide participation in the tournament.

== Broadcasting ==
Star Sports served as host broadcaster of the tournament. In a partnership with Voke, all matches were also streamed in 360-degree video with stereoscopic 3D options.

Countries	Broadcaster
Australia	Fox Sports
Canada	Commonwealth Broadcasting Network
India	Star Sports
Latin America	ESPN
Saudi Arabia	OSN Sports
United Kingdom	Sky Sports
United States	ESPN3; on 8 August 2017, ESPNU carried an encore of the final as part of its "ESPN8: The Ocho" stunt marathon of obscure and unconventional sporting events.

== Group stage ==
Pool A	Pool B
India; Bangladesh; England; Australia; South Korea; Argentina	Iran; United States; Poland; Kenya; Thailand; Japan

Pool points system:

Win	5 points
Draw	3 points
Loss (Score difference is less than or equal to 7)	1 point
Loss (Score difference is More than 7 points)	0 point

=== Pool A ===
Team	Pld	W	D	L	SF	SA	SD	Pts	Qualification
South Korea	5	5	0	0	256	148	108	25	Advance to knockout phase
India	5	4	0	1	286	112	174	21	Advance to knockout phase
Bangladesh	5	3	0	2	251	144	107	16	
England	5	2	0	3	190	230	−40	10	
Australia	5	1	0	4	146	311	−165	5	
Argentina	5	0	0	5	161	345	−184	0	

7 October 2016
20:00

India	32–34	South Korea
	Report

8 October 2016
19:00

England	18–52	Bangladesh
	Report

8 October 2016
21:00

India	54–20	Australia
	Report

9 October 2016
19:00

South Korea	68–42	Argentina

10 October 2016
20:00

England	69–25	Australia

11 October 2016
21:00

India	57–20	Bangladesh
	report

12 October 2016
21:00

Australia	68–45	Argentina

13 October 2016
21:00

Bangladesh	32–35	South Korea
	report

14 October 2016
20:00

England	68–28	Argentina

15 October 2016
19:00

South Korea	63–25	Australia

15 October 2016
18:40

India	74–20	Argentina
	report

16 October 2016
20:00

South Korea	56–17	England
	report

17 October 2016
21:00

Australia	8–80	Bangladesh
	report

18 October 2016
21:00

India	69–18	England
	report

19 October 2016
20:00

Bangladesh	67–26	Argentina

=== Pool B ===
Team	Pld	W	D	L	SF	SA	SD	Pts	Qualification
Thailand	5	4	0	1	247	165	82	20	Advance to knockout phase
Iran	5	4	0	1	212	141	71	20	Advance to knockout phase
Kenya	5	3	0	2	225	180	45	16	
Japan	5	2	0	3	172	164	8	12	
Poland	5	2	0	3	211	206	5	11	
United States	5	0	0	5	104	315	−211	0	

7 October 2016
21:00

United States	15–52	Iran
	Report

8 October 2016
20:00

Poland	48–54	Kenya
	Report

9 October 2016
20:00

United States	19–45	Japan

9 October 2016
21:00

Iran	64–23	Thailand

10 October 2016
21:00

Poland	25–65	Thailand

11 October 2016
20:00

Iran	33–28	Kenya

12 October 2016
20:00

Poland	22–33	Japan

13 October 2016
20:00

Thailand	53–21	Kenya

14 October 2016
21:00

United States	29–75	Poland

15 October 2016
20:00

Japan	34–38	Iran

16 October 2016
19:00

Thailand	69–22	United States

16 October 2016
21:00

Japan	27–48	Kenya
	report

17 October 2016
20:00

Poland	41–25	Iran

18 October 2016
20:00

United States	19–74	Kenya

19 October 2016
21:00

Thailand	37–33	Japan

== Knockout stage ==
Semi-finals
A1	South Korea	22
B2	Iran	28
B1	Thailand	20
A2	India	73

Final
SF1	Iran	29
SF2	India	38

=== Semi-finals ===
21 October 2016
20:00

South Korea	22–28	Iran
	report

21 October 2016
21:00

Thailand	20–73	India
	report

=== Final ===
22 October 2016
19:45

Iran	29–38	India
	report

== Statistics ==
=== Top Raiders ===
Player	Pts
(India) Ajay Thakur	64
(Thailand) Khomsan Thongkham	56
(Bangladesh) Md Aruduzzaman Munshi	54
(England) Temi Tope Adewalure	51
(India) Pardeep Narwal	49

=== Top Defenders ===
Player	Pts
(India) PO Surjeet SINGH	23
(Iran) Fazel Atrachali	22
(India) Manjeet Chhillar	22
(Kenya) James Odhiamboobi	22
(India) Surender Nada	21

== Awards ==
Best Raider	(India) Ajay Thakur
Best Defender	(India) Surjeet
Emerging Player	(South Korea) Jang Kun Lee
Emerging Team	Kenya
Best Referee	(Bangladesh) S.K. Monu
