= Bangladesh at the 2014 Asian Games =

- IOC code: BAN
- NOC: Bangladesh Olympic Association

in Incheon
- Competitors: 137 in 14 sports
- Flag bearer: Abdullah Hel Baki
- Medals Ranked 33rd: Gold 0 Silver 1 Bronze 2 Total 3

Asian Games appearances (overview)
- 1978; 1982; 1986; 1990; 1994; 1998; 2002; 2006; 2010; 2014; 2018; 2022; 2026

Bangladesh participated in the 2014 Asian Games in Incheon, South Korea from 19 September to 4 October 2014. A total of 137 athletes from Bangladesh participated in 14 sports.

== Medal summary ==
=== Medalists ===
Medal	Name	Sport	Event
Silver	Rumana Ahmed; Salma Khatun; Panna Ghosh; Shohely Akhter; Shaila Sharmin; Fahima Khatun; Sanjida Islam; Lata Mondal; Nuzhat Tasnia; Shahanaz Parvin; Jahanara Alam; Khadija Tul Kubra; Ayasha Rahman; Sharmin Akhter; Farzana Hoque	Cricket	Women
Bronze	Sabbir Rahman; Mashrafe Mortaza; Taskin Ahmed; Arafat Sunny; Mithun Ali; Shuvagata Hom; Ziaur Rahman; Tamim Iqbal; Mahmudullah Riyad; Rubel Hossain; Imrul Kayes; Shamsur Rahman; Anamul Haque; Nasir Hossain; Shakib Al Hasan	Cricket	Men
Bronze	Shahnaz Parvin Maleka; Kazi Shahin Ara; Sharmin Sultana Rima; Farzana Akhter Baby; Fatema Akhter Poly; Juni Chakma; Shila Akhter; Rupali Akhter; Suma Akhter; Mita Khatun; Tuktuki Akhter; Azmira Khatun Dola	Kabaddi	Women

== Archery ==
Men

Athlete	Event	Ranking round		Round of 64	Round of 32	Round of 16	Quarterfinals	Semifinals	Final	
Athlete	Event	Score	Seed	Opposition Score	Opposition Score	Opposition Score	Opposition Score	Opposition Score	Opposition Score	Rank
Mohammed Milon	Men's individual recurve	1267	36	did not advance						
Prennoy Murong	Men's individual recurve	1220	46	did not advance						
Mohammed Shana	Men's individual recurve	1286	28	Bye	Gankin (KAZ); L 1–7	did not advance				
Shiek Sojeb	Men's individual recurve	1282	30	Bye	Pak (PRK); L 0–6	did not advance				
Mohammed Milon; Mohammed Shana; Shiek Sojeb	Men's team recurve	3835	8	—N/a		Mongolia; L 4–5	did not advance			

Women

Athlete	Event	Ranking round		Round of 64	Round of 32	Round of 16	Quarterfinals	Semifinals	Final	
Athlete	Event	Score	Seed	Opposition Score	Opposition Score	Opposition Score	Opposition Score	Opposition Score	Opposition Score	Rank
Rabeua Khatun	Women's individual recurve	1083	53	did not advance						
Mathui Marma	Women's individual recurve	1269	32	Altangerel (MGL); W 6–4	Cheng (CHN); L 2–6	did not advance				
Beauty Ray	Women's individual recurve	1147	48	did not advance						
Shamoli Ray	Women's individual recurve	1252	36	Choirunisa (INA); L 2–6	did not advance					
Mathui Marma; Beauty Ray; Shamoli Ray	Women's team recurve	3668	11	—N/a		Indonesia; L 0–6	did not advance			

== Cricket ==
=== Men ===
All members of the Bangladesh men's cricket team have played for the Bangladesh national cricket team in 2014. Shohag Gazi and Al-Amin Hossain were initially named in the squad but were omitted after being reported for an illegal bowling action in September 2014, they were replaced by Shakib Al Hasan and Rubel Hossain respectively.

- Mashrafe Mortaza (c)
- Taskin Ahmed
- Shakib Al Hasan
- Mithun Ali
- Mukhtar Ali
- Anamul Haque
- Shuvagata Hom
- Nasir Hossain
- Rubel Hossain
- Tamim Iqbal
- Imrul Kayes
- Mahmudullah
- Sabbir Rahman
- Shamsur Rahman
- Arafat Sunny

Quarterfinal

1 October
14:00
Scorecard

Bangladesh; 224/9 (20.0 overs)	v	Kuwait; 21 (13.0 overs)
Mithun Ali 59 (25); Bastaki Fahad 3/48 (4.0 ov)		Alotaibi Mohammed 7 (8); Arafat Sunny 4/8 (2.0 ov)

Bangladesh won by 203 runs
Yeonhui Cricket Ground, Incheon
Umpires: Irfan Ghafoor and Buddhi Pradhan

- Kuwait won the toss and chose to field

Semifinal

2 October
14:00
Scorecard

Sri Lanka	v	Bangladesh; 59/3 (11.0 overs)
		Sabbir Rahman 27* (25); Dilhara Lokuhettige 2/2 (2.0 ov)

No Result
Yeonhui Cricket Ground, Incheon
Umpires: Ramani Batumalai and Sarika Prasad

- Sri Lanka won the toss and chose to field
- Rain stopped Bangladesh's innings after 11 overs. Coin was flipped to decide the result of the match.
- Sri Lanka won by spin of coin and qualified for the Final while Bangladesh qualified for the Bronze medal match.

Bronze medal match

3 October
09:30
Scorecard

Hong Kong; 135/7 (20 overs)	v	Bangladesh; 162/6 (20 overs)
Mark Chapman 38 (31); Arafat Sunny 3/22 (4 overs)		Shakib Al Hasan 46 (37); Nadeem Ahmed 3/36 (4 overs)

Bangladesh won by 27 runs
Yeonhui Cricket Ground, Incheon
Umpires: Ramani Batumalai and Riaz Chaudhry

- Bangladesh won the toss and chose to bat

=== Women ===
- Rumana Ahmed
- Sharmin Akhter
- Shohaly Akther
- Jahanara Alam
- Panna Ghosh
- Farzana Hoque
- Sanjida Islam
- Fahima Khatun
- Salma Khatun
- Khadija Tul Kubra
- Lata Mondal
- Shahanaz Parvin
- Shukhtara Rahman
- Shaila Sharmin
- Nuzhat Tasnia

Quarterfinal

24 September
14:00
Scorecard

Bangladesh; 107/4 (20.0 overs)	v	Nepal; 26 (15.3 overs)
Ayasha Rahman 51* (60); Sarita Magar 2/19 (4.0 ov)		Nary Thapa 8 (13); Salma Khatun 3/1 (3.0 ov)

Bangladesh won by 81 runs
Yeonhui Cricket Ground, Incheon
Umpires: Liu Jingmin and Sarika Prasad

- Nepal won the toss and chose to field

Semifinal

25 September
14:00
Scorecard

Bangladesh; 95/4 (20.0 overs)	v	Sri Lanka; 70 (18.2 overs)
Lata Mondal 34* (43); Chandima Gunaratne 1/10 (4.0 ov)		Shashikala Siriwardene 15 (27); Panna Ghosh 5/10 (4.0 ov)

Bangladesh won by 25 runs
Yeonhui Cricket Ground, Incheon
Umpires: Sarika Prasad and Riaz Chaudhry

- Bangladesh won the toss and chose to bat

Final

26 September
14:00
Scorecard

Bangladesh; 38/9 (7.0 overs)	v	Pakistan; 97/6 (20.0 overs)
Farzana Hoque 10 (9); Sadia Yousuf, Nida Dar 2/2 (1.0 ov)		Bismah Maroof 24 (27); Rumana Ahmed 2/13 (4.0 ov)

Pakistan won by 4 (D/L method)
Yeonhui Cricket Ground, Incheon
Umpires: Ramani Batumalai and Sarika Prasad

- Pakistan won the toss and chose to bat
- Rain Delay - Target revised to 43 from 7 overs (D/L method).

== Football ==
=== Group B ===
Pos	Team	Pld	W	D	L	GF	GA	GD	Pts
1	Uzbekistan	3	2	1	0	9	1	+8	7
2	Hong Kong	3	2	1	0	5	3	+2	7
3	Bangladesh	3	1	0	2	2	5	−3	3
4	Afghanistan	3	0	0	3	1	8	−7	0

Source: RSSSF
15 September 2014
17:00

Bangladesh	1–0	Afghanistan
Mamunul Islam 83'	Report

Incheon Munhak Stadium
Referee: Vo Minh Tri (Vietnam)

18 September 2014
20:00

Uzbekistan	3-0	Bangladesh
Vokhid Shodiev 14', 21'; Sardor Rashidov 34'	Report

Ansan Wa~ Stadium
Referee: Ming Hsun Yu (Chinese Taipei)

22 September 2014
17:00

Hong Kong	2-1	Bangladesh

Hwaseong Stadium

== Field hockey ==
=== Men ===
==== Group A ====
Rank	Team	Pld	W	D	L	GF	GA	GD	Pts
8	South Korea	4	4	0	0	25	1	+24	12
13	Malaysia	4	3	0	1	18	6	+12	9
14	Japan	4	2	0	2	22	8	+15	6
30	Bangladesh	4	1	0	2	3	21	-18	3
36	Singapore	4	0	0	4	3	35	-32	0

20 September
13:00

Japan	8–0	Bangladesh
Sakamoto 3', 49'; Ono 11'; Nagasawa 21', 56'; Tanaka 33', 43', 48'	Report

Seonhak Hockey Stadium, Incheon

21 September
13:00

Malaysia	5–1	Bangladesh
Rahim 20', 60'; Jalil 46'; Tajuddin 52'; Abdullah 59'	Report	Das 30'

Seonhak Hockey Stadium, Incheon

23 September
15:00

Bangladesh	2–1	Singapore
Khisa 22'; Khorshadur Rahman 25'	Report	Yi Ru Tan 47'

Seonhak Hockey Stadium, Incheon

27 September
19:00

South Korea	7–0	Bangladesh
Kim 4'; Kang 6'; Oh 19'; You 30'; Jang 42', 51'; Nam 59'

Seonhak Hockey Stadium, Incheon

=== 7th-8th-place play-off ===
27 September
19:00

Bangladesh	2–3	Oman
Khisa 11'; Das 39'		Al Balushi 33'; Al Shibli 37'; Basim 45'

Seonhak Hockey Stadium, Incheon

== Golf ==
Athlete	Event	Round 1		Round 2			Round 3			Round 4			Total	
Athlete	Event	Score	Rank	Score	Total	Rank	Score	Total	Rank	Score	Total	Rank	Score	Rank
Sajib Ali	Men's individual	-2	9	+2	E	25	-2	-2	18	E	-2	22	-2	22
Ismail	Men's individual	+6	55	+3	+9	45	E	+9	39	E	+9	39	+9	39
Mohammad Nazim	Men's individual	+5	50	+1	+6	37	-4	+2	30	+3	+5	35	+5	35
Mohammad Sagor	Men's individual	+8	61	+4	+12	54	+6	+18	54	+5	+23	53	+23	53
Sajib Ali Ismail Mohammad Nazim Mohammad Sagor	Men's team	+9	11	+6	+15	10	-6	+9	9	+3	+12	10	+12	10

== Gymnastics ==
=== Artistic ===
Men

Athlete	Event	Qualification		Final	
Athlete	Event	Total	Rank	Total	Rank
Syque Caesar	Men's floor	13.700	34	Did not advance	
Syque Caesar	Men's parallel bars	15.150	7 Q	14.866	7
Syque Caesar	Men 's horizontal bar	14.200	8 Q	14.133	7

== Kabaddi ==
=== Men ===
Preliminary round

Group A

Team	Pld	W	D	L	PF	PA	PD	Pts
India	3	3	0	0	119	53	66	6
Pakistan	3	2	0	1	86	64	22	4
Thailand	3	1	0	2	94	153	-59	2
Bangladesh	3	0	0	3	62	91	-29	0

28 September; 14:00	India	30–15	Bangladesh	Songdo Global University Gymnasium, Incheon
28 September; 14:00		(16–6)		Songdo Global University Gymnasium, Incheon

29 September; 15:00	Pakistan	24–11	Bangladesh	Songdo Global University Gymnasium, Incheon
29 September; 15:00		(13–4)		Songdo Global University Gymnasium, Incheon

1 October; 14:00	Thailand	37–36	Bangladesh	Songdo Global University Gymnasium, Incheon
1 October; 14:00		(16–21)		Songdo Global University Gymnasium, Incheon

=== Women ===
Preliminary round
Group A

Team	Pld	W	D	L	PF	PA	PD	Pts
India	2	2	0	0	74	44	30	4
Bangladesh	2	1	0	1	48	47	1	2
South Korea	2	0	0	2	44	75	-31	0

28 September; 09:20	India	29–18	Bangladesh	Songdo Global University Gymnasium, Incheon
28 September; 09:20		(22–5)		Songdo Global University Gymnasium, Incheon

29 September; 10:00	Bangladesh	30–18	South Korea	Songdo Global University Gymnasium, Incheon
29 September; 10:00		(14–11)		Songdo Global University Gymnasium, Incheon

Semifinal

2 October; 11:00	Bangladesh	15–40	Iran	Songdo Global University Gymnasium, Incheon
2 October; 11:00		(2–25)		Songdo Global University Gymnasium, Incheon

== Shooting ==
Clay Target

Athlete	Event	Qualification		Semifinals	Final	
Athlete	Event	Result	Rank	Opposition Result	Opposition Result	Rank
Sabbir Hasan	Men's Skeet	91	38	did not advance		
Iqbal Islam	Men's Skeet	105	30	did not advance		
Noor Salim	Men's Skeet	108	28	did not advance		
	Men's Skeet Team	—N/a			304	9
Quaysoor Miah	Men's Trap	101	41	did not advance		

Small Bore and Pistol

Men

Athlete	Event	Qualification		Final	
Athlete	Event	Points	Rank	Points	Rank
Abdullah Baki	Men's 10m Air Rifle	619.6	15	did not advance	
Mahmodul Hasan	Men's 10m Air Rifle	606.5	45	did not advance	
Mohammad Zesimuzzaman	Men's 10m Air Rifle	613.8	32	did not advance	
Abdullah Baki; Mahmodul Hasan; Mohammad Zesimuzzaman	Men's 10m Air Rifle Team	—N/a		1839.9	10

Women

Athlete	Event	Qualification		Final	
Athlete	Event	Points	Rank	Points	Rank
Sharmin Akhter	Women's 10m Air Rifle	409.2	31	did not advance	
Syeda Sultana	Women's 10m Air Rifle	408.8	34	did not advance	
Sharmin Ratna	Women's 10m Air Rifle	407.0	37	did not advance	
Sharmin Akhter; Syeda Sultana; Sharmin Ratna	Women's 10m Air Rifle Team	—N/a		1225.0	10
Armin Asha	Women's 10m Air Pistol	369	33	did not advance	
Ardina Ferdous	Women's 10m Air Pistol	365	40	did not advance	
Sinthia Tumpa	Women's 10m Air Pistol	362	41	did not advance	
Armin Asha; Ardina Ferdous; Sinthia Tumpa	Women's 10m Air Pistol Team	—N/a		1096	12

== Taekwondo ==
Men

Athlete	Event	Round of 32	Round of 16	Quarterfinals	Semifinals	Final
Athlete	Event	Opposition Result	Opposition Result	Opposition Result	Opposition Result	Opposition Result
Mohammad Islam	Finweight					
Jwalanta Chakma	Flyweight	Bye				

Women

Athlete	Event	Round of 32	Round of 16	Quarterfinals	Semifinals	Final
Athlete	Event	Opposition Result	Opposition Result	Opposition Result	Opposition Result	Opposition Result
Shraboni Biswas	Middleweight	—N/a	Ananbeh (JOR)			

== Volleyball ==
=== Beach ===
Athlete	Event	Preliminary round	Standing	Semifinals	Final / BM	
Athlete	Event	Opposition Score	Standing	Opposition Score	Opposition Score	Rank
Horosit Biswas; Monir Hossain	Men's	Qatar; L 0–2 Cambodia; L 0–2; Sri Lanka; L 0–2	4th	did not advance		

== Weightlifting ==
Men

Athlete	Event	Snatch		Clean & Jerk		Total	Rank
Athlete	Event	Result	Rank	Result	Rank	Total	Rank
Mostain Bella	-62 kg						
Shimul Singha	-69 kg						
Hamidul Islam	-77 kg						
Manoranjan Roy	-85 kg						
Bidduth Roy	+105 kg						

Women

Athlete	Event	Snatch		Clean & Jerk		Total	Rank
Athlete	Event	Result	Rank	Result	Rank	Total	Rank
Jahura Reshma	-48 kg	Did not start					
Molla Shabira	-53 kg						
Fayema Akther	-58 kg						
Mabia Akhter Simanta	-63 kg						
Rokey Sultana Sathy	-69 kg						

== Wushu ==
Nanquan\Nangun

Athlete	Event	Nanquan		Nangun		Total	
Athlete	Event	Points	Rank	Points	Rank	Points	Rank
Amir Hossain	Men's Nanquan / Nangun all-round	7.94	14	8.29	11	16.23	12

Sanshou

Athlete	Event	Round of 16	Quarterfinals	Semifinals	Final
Athlete	Event	Opposition Result	Opposition Result	Opposition Result	Opposition Result
Sherin Sultana	60 kg	Song (KOR); L 0–2	did not advance		

== See also ==
- Bangladesh at the Asian Games
- Bangladesh at the Olympics
