= Bangladesh at the 2018 Asian Games =

- IOC code: BAN
- NOC: Bangladesh Olympic Association
- Website: www.nocban.org

in Jakarta and Palembang August 18 – September 2
- Competitors: 117 in 14 sports
- Flag bearer: Mabia Akhter
- Medals: Gold 0 Silver 0 Bronze 0 Total 0

Asian Games appearances (overview)
- 1978; 1982; 1986; 1990; 1994; 1998; 2002; 2006; 2010; 2014; 2018; 2022; 2026

Bangladesh competed at the 2018 Asian Games in Jakarta and Palembang, Indonesia, from 18 August to 2 September 2018. A total of 117 athletes from Bangladesh participating in 14 sports.

== Competitors ==
The following is a list of the number of competitors representing Bangladesh that participated at the Games:

Sport	Men	Women	Total
Archery	7	6	13
Athletics	1	1	2
Basketball	4	0	4
Beach Volleyball	2	0	2
Contract bridge	5	0	5
Field hockey	18	0	18
Football	20	0	20
Golf	4	2	6
Kabaddi	12	12	24
Rowing	1	0	1
Shooting	9	7	16
Swimming	1	1	2
Weightlifting	0	1	1
Wrestling	2	1	3
Total	86	31	117

== Archery ==
Recurve

Athlete	Event	Ranking round		Round of 64	Round of 32	Round of 16	Quarterfinals	Semifinals	Final / BM	
Athlete	Event	Score	Seed	Opposition Score	Opposition Score	Opposition Score	Opposition Score	Opposition Score	Opposition Score	Rank
Md Emdadul Haque Milon	Men's individual	641	38	did not advance						
Md Ibrahim Sheik Rezowan	Men's individual	643	23	Onmanee (LAO); W 6–0	Li (CHN); L 2–6	did not advance				
Md Ruman Shana	Men's individual	677	3	Bye	Thamwong (THA); W 6–2	Agatha (INA); L 4–6	did not advance			
Mohammad Tamimul Islam	Men's individual	635	44	did not advance						
Md Emdadul Haque Milon; Md Ibrahim Sheik Rezowan; Md Ruman Shana	Men's team	1961	7	—	Bye	Mongolia (MGL); L 2–6	did not advance			
Beauty Ray	Women's individual	583	57	did not advance						
Mst Ety Khatun	Women's individual	593	32	Tagle (PHI); L 5–6	did not advance					
Nasrin Akter	Women's individual	610	27	Tagaeva (TJK); L 2–6	did not advance					
Beauty Ray; Mst Ety Khatun; Nasrin Akter	Women's team	1786	13	—		Japan (JPN); L 2–6	did not advance			
Md Ruman Shana; Nasrin Akter	Mixed team	1287	12	—	United Arab Emirates (UAE); W 6–4	Kazakhstan (KAZ); W 5–4	Japan (JPN); L 1–5	did not advance		

Compound

Athlete	Event	Ranking round		Round of 32	Round of 16	Quarterfinals	Semifinals	Final / BM	
Athlete	Event	Score	Seed	Opposition Score	Opposition Score	Opposition Score	Opposition Score	Opposition Score	Rank
Abul Kashem Mamun; Ashim Kumer Das; Muhammed Jabed Alam	Men's team	2041	9	—	Indonesia (INA); L 228–230	did not advance			
Biswas Suma; Bonna Akther; Roksana Akter	Women's team	1997	10	—	Indonesia (INA); L 208–222	did not advance			
Ashim Kumer Das; Roksana Akter	Mixed team	1364	12	Bye	Philippines (PHI); L 149–154	did not advance			

== Basketball ==
Summary

Team	Event	Group Stage					Quarterfinal	Semifinals / Pl.	Final / BM / Pl.	
Team	Event	Opposition Score	Opposition Score	Opposition Score	Opposition Score	Rank	Opposition Score	Opposition Score	Opposition Score	Rank
Bangladesh men's	Men's 3x3 tournament	Kyrgyzstan; L 7−10	Mongolia; L 13−17	Chinese Taipei; L 8−21	South Korea; L 7−21	5	did not advance			

=== 3x3 basketball ===
Bangladesh national 3x3 team will participate in the Games. The men's team placed in pool B based on the FIBA 3x3 federation ranking.

==== Men's tournament ====
Roster

The following is the Bangladesh roster in the men's 3x3 basketball tournament of the 2018 Asian Games.

- Mahfuzul Haque
- Sajid Istiaque
- Mostafa Chowdhury
- Shahanur Rahman

Pool B

Pos	Team	Pld	W	L	PF	PA	PD	Qualification
1	South Korea	4	4	0	83	46	+37	Quarterfinals
2	Chinese Taipei	4	3	1	79	50	+29	Quarterfinals
3	Mongolia	4	2	2	63	68	−5	
4	Kyrgyzstan	4	1	3	44	71	−27	
5	Bangladesh	4	0	4	35	69	−34	

Source: OCA

22 August
15:00

Kyrgyzstan	10–7	Bangladesh
Pts: Demchenko 5		Pts: Chowdhury 4

Gelora Bung Karno Tennis Center Court, Jakarta
Referees: Quinn (INA), Ibragimow (TKM)

22 August
16:30

Bangladesh	13–17	Mongolia
Pts: Rahman 5		Pts: Mönkh-Orgil, Enkhbaatar 6

Gelora Bung Karno Tennis Center Court, Jakarta
Referees: Quinn (INA), Ibragimow (TKM)

25 August
17:50

Chinese Taipei	21–8	Bangladesh
Pts: Chu 7		Pts: Rahman 5

Gelora Bung Karno Tennis Center Court, Jakarta
Referees: Tan (SGP), Ito (JPN)

25 August
19:20

Bangladesh	7–21	South Korea
Pts: Rahman 6		Pts: An 12

Gelora Bung Karno Tennis Center Court, Jakarta
Referees: Ibragimow (TKM), Rulyov (KAZ)

== Contract bridge ==
Men

Athlete	Event	Qualification		Semifinal		Final	
Athlete	Event	Point	Rank	Point	Rank	Point	Rank
Mohammed Salahuddin; Nurul Huda Shamsuzzaman	Pair	1433.9	20 Q	886.4	23	did not advance	
Dewan Mohammad Hanzala; Sayeed Ahmed	Pair	DNS	—	did not advance			
Dewan Mohammad Hanzala; Bani Amin; Mohammed Salahuddin; Nurul Huda Shamsuzzaman; Sayeed Ahmed	Team	98.32	11	did not advance			

== Field hockey ==
Bangladesh qualified a men's field hockey team after progressed to the semi-finals at the qualifying tournament in Muscat, Oman.

Summary

Team	Event	Group Stage						Semifinal	Final / BM / Pl.	
Team	Event	Opposition Score	Opposition Score	Opposition Score	Opposition Score	Opposition Score	Rank	Opposition Score	Opposition Score	Rank
Bangladesh men's	Men's tournament	Oman; W 2–1	Kazakhstan; W 6–1	Malaysia; L 0–7	Thailand; W 3–1	Pakistan; L 0–5	3	Did not advance	South Korea; L 0–7	6

=== Men's tournament ===
Roster

The following is the Bangladesh roster in the men's field hockey tournament of the 2018 Asian Games.

Head coach: (Malaysia) Gobinathan Krishnamurthy

1. Asim Gope (GK)
2. Mamunur Rahman Chayan
3. Farhad Shetul
4. Khorshadur Rahman
5. Imran Hasan
6. Roman Sarkar
7. Rashel Mahmud
8. Fazla Rabby
9. Milon Hossain
10. Mainul Islam
11. A.H.M. Kamruzzaman
12. Puskar Khisa
13. Sobuj Shohanur
14. Sarower Hossain
15. Naim Uddin
17. Ashraful Islam
19. Arshad Hossain
22. Abu Nippon (GK)

Pool B

Pos	Team	Pld	W	D	L	PF	PA	PD	Pts	Qualification
1	Pakistan	5	5	0	0	45	1	+44	15	Semi-finals
2	Malaysia	5	4	0	1	41	6	+35	12	Semi-finals
3	Bangladesh	5	3	0	2	11	15	−4	9	Fifth place game
4	Oman	5	2	0	3	7	19	−12	6	Seventh place game
5	Thailand	5	1	0	4	4	27	−23	3	Ninth place game
6	Kazakhstan	5	0	0	5	5	45	−40	0	Eleventh place game

Source: FIH
Rules for classification: 1) points; 2) goal difference; 3) goals scored; 4) head-to-head result.

20 August 2018
16:00

Bangladesh	2–1	Oman
Hossain 14'; Ashraful Islam 28'	Report	Al-Shaaibi 23'

Umpires:
Federico Garcia (URU)
Javed Shaikh (IND)

22 August 2018
10:00

Kazakhstan	1–6	Bangladesh
Tashkeyev 52'	Report	Rabby 11'; Mahmud 14'; Mainul Islam 19'; Rahman 32', 48'; Chayan 60'

Umpires:
Raghu Prasad (IND)
Michihiko Watanabe (JPN)

24 August 2018
12:00

Bangladesh	0–7	Malaysia
	Report	Rahim 18', 22'; Aideed 28'; Fa. Saari 31' van Huizen 38'; Fiqri 44'; Ashaari 60'

Umpires:
Raghu Prasad (IND)
Gus Soteriades (USA)

26 August 2018
16:00

Thailand	1–3	Bangladesh
Harapan 47'	Report	Islam 35', 41'; Hossain 55'

Umpires:
Javed Shaikh (IND)
Michihiko Watanabe (JPN)

28 August 2018
18:00

Bangladesh	0-5	Pakistan
	Report	Atiq 2', 48'; Ali 9', 25'; Shan 36'

Umpires:
Javed Shaikh (IND)
Gareth Greenfield (NZL)

Fifth place game

1 September 2018
15:00

South Korea	7–0	Bangladesh
Kim J 10'; Seo 15'; Jeong J 26'; Jang 27', 44'; Jung 33'; Lee 57'	Report

Umpires:
Rawi Anbananthan (MAS)
You Suolong (CHN)

== Football ==
Bangladesh drawn in the Group B at the men's football event.

Summary

Team	Event	Group Stage				Round of 16	Quarterfinal	Semifinal	Final / BM	
Team	Event	Opposition Score	Opposition Score	Opposition Score	Rank	Opposition Score	Opposition Score	Opposition Score	Opposition Score	Rank
Bangladesh men's	Men's tournament	Uzbekistan; L 0–3	Thailand; D 1–1	Qatar; W 1–0	2	North Korea; L 1–3	did not advance			15

=== Men's tournament ===
Roster

The following is the Bangladesh squad in the men's football tournament of the 2018 Asian Games.

Head coach: (England) Jamie Day

No.	Pos.	Player	Date of birth (age)	Club
1	GK	Ashraful Islam Rana*	1 May 1988 (aged 30)	(Bangladesh Football Federation) Sheikh Russel
2	DF	Sushanto Tripura	5 October 1998 (aged 19)	(Bangladesh Football Federation) Saif Sporting
3	DF	Rahmat Mia	8 December 1999 (aged 18)	(Bangladesh Football Federation) Saif Sporting
4	MF	Jamal Bhuyan* (captain)	10 April 1990 (aged 28)	(Bangladesh Football Federation) Saif Sporting
5	DF	Tutul Hossain Badsha	12 August 1999 (aged 18)	(Bangladesh Football Federation) Dhaka Abahani
6	DF	Topu Barman*	20 December 1994 (aged 23)	(Bangladesh Football Federation) Saif Sporting
7	FW	Mahbubur Rahman Sufil	10 September 1999 (aged 18)	(Bangladesh Football Federation) Bashundhara Kings
8	MF	Atiqur Rahman Fahad	15 September 1995 (aged 22)	(Bangladesh Football Federation) Dhaka Abahani
9	FW	Saad Uddin	1 September 1998 (aged 19)	(Bangladesh Football Federation) Dhaka Abahani
10	MF	Masuk Mia Jony	16 January 1998 (aged 20)	(Bangladesh Football Federation) Saif Sporting
11	FW	Jafar Iqbal	27 September 1997 (aged 20)	(Bangladesh Football Federation) Chittagong Abahani
12	DF	Bishwanath Ghosh	30 May 1999 (aged 19)	(Bangladesh Football Federation) Sheikh Russel
13	GK	Anisur Rahman	10 August 1997 (aged 21)	(Bangladesh Football Federation) Bashundhara Kings
14	FW	Mohammad Abdullah	16 October 1997 (aged 20)	(Bangladesh Football Federation) Chittagong Abahani
15	MF	Biplu Ahmed	5 May 1999 (aged 19)	(Bangladesh Football Federation) Sheikh Russel
16	FW	Motin Mia	20 December 1998 (aged 19)	(Bangladesh Football Federation) Bashundhara Kings
17	MF	Rabiul Hasan	26 June 1999 (aged 19)	(Bangladesh Football Federation) Arambagh
18	DF	Monjurur Rahman	5 September 1996 (aged 21)	(Bangladesh Football Federation) Mohammedan
19	MF	Fazlay Rabbi	16 May 1996 (aged 22)	(Bangladesh Football Federation) Sheikh Russel
23	GK	Mahfuz Hasan Pritom	5 November 1999 (aged 18)	(Bangladesh Football Federation) Arambagh

* Over-aged player.

Pool B

Pos	Team	Pld	W	D	L	GF	GA	GD	Pts	Qualification
1	Uzbekistan	3	3	0	0	10	0	+10	9	Advance to knockout stage
2	Bangladesh	3	1	1	1	2	4	−2	4	Advance to knockout stage
3	Thailand	3	0	2	1	2	3	−1	2	
4	Qatar	3	0	1	2	1	8	−7	1	

Source: Asian Games 2018
Rules for classification: Group stage tiebreakers
14 August 2018
16:00 UTC+7

Uzbekistan	3–0	Bangladesh
Urinboev 23'; Khamdamov 57'; Alibaev 66'	Report

Pakansari Stadium, Cibinong
Referee: Ali Shaban (Kuwait)

16 August 2018
16:00 UTC+7

Bangladesh	1–1	Thailand
Sufil 52'	Report	Supachai 80'

Pakansari Stadium, Cibinong
Referee: Ali Reda (Lebanon)

19 August 2018
19:00 UTC+7

Bangladesh	1–0	Qatar
Bhuyan 90+3'	Report

Patriot Candrabhaga Stadium, Bekasi
Referee: Jansen Foo (Singapore)

Round of 16

24 August 2018
19:30 UTC+7

Bangladesh	1–3	North Korea
Saad Uddin 90+1'	Report	Kim Yu-song 14' (pen.); Han Yong-thae 38'; Kang Kuk-chol 68'

Wibawa Mukti Stadium, Cikarang
Referee: Ammar Mahfoodh (Bahrain)

== Golf ==
Bangladesh entered six golfers (4 men's and 2 women's) who competed in the individual and team event. Several national golf associations complained to the Court of Arbitration for Sport that Bangladesh has included professional golfers, but the CAS ruled that none of the players were professional.

Men

Athlete	Event	Round 1	Round 2	Round 3	Round 4	Total		
Athlete	Event	Score	Score	Score	Score	Score	Par	Rank
Md Shomrat Sikder	Individual	81	78	79	80	318	+30	61
Md Shahab Uddin	Individual	79	82	75	75	311	+23	55
Md Shafique Bakha	Individual	80	74	82	82	318	+30	61
Mohammad Farhad	Individual	83	74	80	81	318	+30	61
Md Shomrat Sikder; Md Shahab Uddin; Md Shafique Bakha; Mohammad Farhad	Team	240	226	234	236	936	+72	16

Women

Athlete	Event	Round 1	Round 2	Round 3	Round 4	Total		
Athlete	Event	Score	Score	Score	Score	Score	Par	Rank
Sonya Akther	Individual	82	79	79	80	320	+32	33
Liza Akter	Individual	87	86	80	78	331	+43	34
Sonya Akther; Liza Akter	Team	169	165	159	158	651	+75	13

== Kabaddi ==
Summary

Team	Event	Group Stage					Semifinal	Final	
Team	Event	Opposition Score	Opposition Score	Opposition Score	Opposition Score	Rank	Opposition Score	Opposition Score	Rank
Bangladesh men's	Men	India; L 21−50	Thailand; W 34−22	Sri Lanka; W 29−25	South Korea; L 18−38	3	did not advance		5
Bangladesh women's	Women	Chinese Taipei; L 28−43	Iran; L 19−47	South Korea; L 25−52	—	4	did not advance		7

=== Men's tournament ===
Team roster

- Masud Karim
- Aruduzzaman Munshi
- Md Ashraful Shaikh
- Ziaur Rahman
- Zakir Hossain
- Md Sabuj Mia
- Anwer Hossain
- Fatin Fuhad
- Md Ruhul Amin
- Shazid Hossain
- Arif Robban
- Tuhin Tarafdar

Group A

Pos	Team	Pld	W	D	L	PF	PA	PD	Pts	Qualification
1	South Korea	4	4	0	0	147	84	+63	8	Semifinals
2	India	4	3	0	1	166	103	+63	6	Semifinals
3	Bangladesh	4	2	0	2	102	135	−33	4	
4	Sri Lanka	4	1	0	3	121	135	−14	2	
5	Thailand	4	0	0	4	102	181	−79	0	

Source: OCA

19 August
14:00

Bangladesh	21–50 (HT: 12–20)	India

Garuda Theatre, Jakarta

20 August
14:00

Bangladesh	34–22 (HT: 17–7)	Thailand

Garuda Theatre, Jakarta

21 August
15:00

Bangladesh	29–25 (HT: 17–10)	Sri Lanka

Garuda Theatre, Jakarta

22 August
16:00

Bangladesh	18–38 (HT: 8–18)	South Korea

Garuda Theatre, Jakarta

=== Women's tournament ===
Team roster

- Shahnaz Parvin Maleka
- Rupali Akhter
- Sharmin Sultana Rima
- Shila Akhter
- Fatema Akhter Poly
- Hafiza Akther
- Srity Khatun
- Kochi Rani Mondal
- Kohinur Begum
- Shraboni Mollick
- Rekha Akhter
- Disha Moni Sorker

Group B

Pos	Team	Pld	W	D	L	PF	PA	PD	Pts	Qualification
1	Iran	3	2	0	1	111	61	+50	4 (Note: Match points difference against the teams which scored 25% or more of the league points: IRI +22, TPE 0, KOR −22.)	Semifinals
2	Chinese Taipei	3	2	0	1	81	66	+15	4	Semifinals
3	South Korea	3	2	0	1	92	87	+5	4	
4	Bangladesh	3	0	0	3	72	142	−70	0	

Source: OCA
Notes:

19 August
11:30

Bangladesh	28–43 (HT: 16–23)	Chinese Taipei

Garuda Theatre, Jakarta

20 August
11:30

Bangladesh	19–47 (HT: 8–25)	Iran

Garuda Theatre, Jakarta

21 August
11:30

Bangladesh	25–52 (HT: 11–20)	South Korea

Garuda Theatre, Jakarta

== Rowing ==
Men

Athlete	Event	Heats		Repechage		Final	
Athlete	Event	Time	Rank	Time	Rank	Time	Rank
Aminul Islam Methu	Lightweight single sculls	10:49.91	6 R	11:29.82	5 FB	10:01.28	11

== Shooting ==
Men

Athlete	Event	Qualification		Final	
Athlete	Event	Points	Rank	Points	Rank
Shakil Ahmed	10 m air pistol	570	22	did not advance	
Piash Hossain	10 m air pistol	547	36	did not advance	
Abdullah Hel Baki	10 m air rifle	618.4	19	did not advance	
Risalatul Islam	10 m air rifle	614.3	29	did not advance	
Md. Shovon Chowdhury	50 m rifle three positions	1125	28	did not advance	
Robiul Islam	50 m rifle three positions	1125	29	did not advance	
Sabbir Hasan	Skeet	95	28	did not advance	

Women

Athlete	Event	Qualification		Final	
Athlete	Event	Points	Rank	Points	Rank
Armin Asha	10 m air pistol	556	28	did not advance	
Ardina Ferdous	10 m air pistol	556	30	did not advance	
Sharmin Akter Ratna	10 m air rifle	609.7	34	did not advance	
Ummey Zakia Sultana	10 m air rifle	612.6	25	did not advance	
Suraiya Akter	50 m rifle three positions	1130	25	did not advance	
Sarmin Shilpa	50 m rifle three positions	1097	33	did not advance	

Mixed team

Athlete	Event	Qualification		Final	
Athlete	Event	Points	Rank	Points	Rank
Noor Hasan Alif; Ardina Ferdous	10 m air pistol	734	19	did not advance	
Arnab Sharar; Sayeda Atkia Hasan	10 m air rifle	814.09	13	did not advance	

== Swimming ==
Men

Athlete	Event	Heats		Final	
Athlete	Event	Time	Rank	Time	Rank
Mohammad Mahfizur Rahman	50 m freestyle	24.54	31	did not advance	
Mohammad Mahfizur Rahman	100 m freestyle	53.59	35	did not advance	

Women

Athlete	Event	Heats		Final	
Athlete	Event	Time	Rank	Time	Rank
Khadiza Akter	50 m freestyle	31.96	28	did not advance	
Khadiza Akter	50 m breaststroke	39.57	27	did not advance	
Khadiza Akter	100 m breaststroke	1:27.20	24	did not advance	

== Volleyball ==
=== Beach volleyball ===
Athlete	Event	Preliminary		Round of 16	Quarterfinals	Semifinals	Final / BM	
Athlete	Event	Oppositions Scores	Rank	Opposition Score	Opposition Score	Opposition Score	Opposition Score	Rank
Md Monir Hossain; Md Shahjahan Ali	Men's tournament	Alarqan – Al-Qishawi (PLE): L 0–2; Lau – Wong (HKG): W 2–0; Ramadhan – Pribadi (INA): L 0–2	3	did not advance				

== Weightlifting ==
Women

Athlete	Event	Snatch		Clean & Jerk		Total	Rank
Athlete	Event	Result	Rank	Result	Rank	Total	Rank
Mabia Akhter	−63 kg	77	6	101	6	178	6

== Wrestling ==
Bangladesh competed at the Games with 3 wrestler (2 men's and 1 women's). The men's athletes was defeated in the early round, while the women's athlete failed to win the bronze medal after defeated in the repechage round.

Key:

- F – Victory by fall.
- PP – Decision by points – the loser with technical points.
- PO – Decision by points – the loser without technical points.
- ST – Great superiority – the loser without technical points and a margin of victory of at least 8 (Greco-Roman) or 10 (freestyle) points.

Men's freestyle

Athlete	Event	Qualification	Round of 16	Quarterfinal	Semifinal	Repechage 1	Repechage 2	Final / BM	
Athlete	Event	Opposition Result	Opposition Result	Opposition Result	Opposition Result	Opposition Result	Opposition Result	Opposition Result	Rank
Mohammad Ali Amzad	−74 kg	M Hosseinkhani (IRI); L 0–10	did not advance						19
Sarot Chandra Ray	−86 kg	Bye	A H Faqiri (AFG); L 0–11	did not advance					17

Women's freestyle

Athlete	Event	Round of 16	Quarterfinal	Semifinal	Repechage	Final / BM	
Athlete	Event	Opposition Result	Opposition Result	Opposition Result	Opposition Result	Opposition Result	Rank
Sherin Sultana	−68 kg	Zhou F (CHN); L 0–5^{F}	did not advance		A Gempei (JPN); L 0–10	Did not advance	12
