= Bangladesh at the 2026 Asian Games =

- IOC code: BAN
- NOC: Bangladesh Olympic Association

in Aichi–Nagoya, Japan 19 September – 4 October 2026
- Competitors: 188 in 22 sports
- Flag bearers: Abdullah Hel Baki; Humayra Antora
- Medals Ranked 37th: Gold 0 Silver 0 Bronze 1 Total 1

Asian Games appearances (overview)
- 1978; 1982; 1986; 1990; 1994; 1998; 2002; 2006; 2010; 2014; 2018; 2022; 2026

Bangladesh competed at the 2026 Asian Games in Nagoya, Aichi Prefecture, Japan, from 19 September to 4 October 2026.

The delegation had 188 athletes competing in 22 sports. Cricket, kabaddi, shooting and archery were the projected to be the best chances for Bangladesh to win medals. However, it received one bronze medal, Jinnat Akter's bronze medal in the women's sanda 52 kg event, ranking 37th in the medal total.

== Competitors ==
The following is a list of the number of competitors representing Bangladesh that participated at the Asian Games:

| Sport | Men | Women | Total |
|---|---|---|---|
| Archery | 6 | 6 | 12 |
| Athletics | 1 | 1 | 2 |
| Badminton | 4 | 1 | 5 |
| Beach volleyball | 2 | 2 | 4 |
| Boxing | 2 | 0 | 2 |
| Cricket | 15 | 15 | 30 |
| Cycling | 2 | 0 | 2 |
| Fencing | 3 | 0 | 3 |
| Football | 0 | 23 | 23 |
| Golf | 3 | 0 | 3 |
| Gymnastics | 1 | 1 | 2 |
| Hockey | 18 | 18 | 36 |
| Judo | 2 | 2 | 4 |
| Kabaddi | 12 | 12 | 24 |
| Karate | 2 | 2 | 4 |
| Shooting | 7 | 5 | 12 |
| Surfing | 1 | 1 | 2 |
| Swimming | 1 | 1 | 2 |
| Table tennis | 3 | 3 | 6 |
| Weightlifting | 1 | 3 | 4 |
| Wrestling | 2 | 0 | 2 |
| Wushu | 2 | 2 | 4 |
| Total | 90 | 98 | 188 |

== Medal summary ==
=== Medals by sport ===
| Sport | 1st place, gold medalist(s) | 2nd place, silver medalist(s) | 3rd place, bronze medalist(s) | Total |
| Wushu | 0 | 0 | 1 | 1 |

=== Medals by day ===
| Day | Date | 1st place, gold medalist(s) | 2nd place, silver medalist(s) | 3rd place, bronze medalist(s) | Total |
| Day 1 | 19 September | 0 | 0 | 0 | 0 |
| Day 2 | 20 September | 0 | 0 | 0 | 0 |
| Day 3 | 21 September | 0 | 0 | 0 | 0 |
| Day 4 | 22 September | 0 | 0 | 0 | 0 |
| Day 5 | 23 September | 0 | 0 | 1 | 1 |
| Day 6 | 24 September | 0 | 0 | 0 | 0 |
| Day 7 | 25 September | 0 | 0 | 0 | 0 |
| Day 8 | 26 September | 0 | 0 | 0 | 0 |
| Day 9 | 27 September | 0 | 0 | 0 | 0 |
| Day 10 | 28 September | 0 | 0 | 0 | 0 |
| Day 11 | 29 September | 0 | 0 | 0 | 0 |
| Day 12 | 30 September | 0 | 0 | 0 | 0 |
| Day 13 | 1 October | 0 | 0 | 0 | 0 |
| Day 14 | 2 October | 0 | 0 | 0 | 0 |
| Day 15 | 3 October | 0 | 0 | 0 | 0 |
| Day 16 | 4 October | 0 | 0 | 0 | 0 |

=== Medalists ===
| Medal | Athlete | Sport | Event | Date |
|---|---|---|---|---|
| Bronze | Jinnat Akter | Wushu | Women's sanda (52 kg) | 23 September |

== Archery ==
Source : OSA

== Athletics ==
Key

- Note–Ranks given for track events are within the athlete's heat only
- Q = Qualified for the next round
- q = Qualified for the next round as a fastest loser or, in field events, by position without achieving the qualifying target
- NR = National record
- N/A = Round not applicable for the event
- Bye = Athlete not required to compete in round

Track events

| Athlete | Event | Heat | | Semifinal | | Final | |
| Athlete | Event | Result | Rank | Result | Rank | Result | Rank |
|---|---|---|---|---|---|---|---|
| Imranur Rahman | Men's 100 m | 10.49 | 4 | 10.44 | 7 | Did not advance | 21 |

Field events

| Athlete | Event | Qualification | | Final | |
| Athlete | Event | Result | Rank | Result | Rank |
|---|---|---|---|---|---|
| Mosammat Khatun | Long jump | Bye | | 5.69 | 15 |

== Cricket ==
| Team | Event | Group Stage | | | Quarterfinal | Semifinal | Final / BM | |
| Team | Event | Opposition Result | Opposition Result | Rank | Opposition Result | Opposition Result | Opposition Result | Rank |
|---|---|---|---|---|---|---|---|---|
| Bangladesh men's | Men's tournament | Bye | | | Malaysia; W NR | Pakistan; L by 6 wickets 111/7 (13) – 112/4 (11.3) | Sri Lanka; L by 63 runs 165/9 (20) – 102 (17.3) | 4th |
| Bangladesh women's | Women's tournament | —N/a | | | China; W NR | India; L by 114 runs 81 (15.4) – 195/4 (20) | Pakistan; L by 31 runs 114/7 (20) – 145/8 (20) | 4th |

=== Men's tournament ===
Squad

- Litton Das (c)
- Tawhid Hridoy (vc)
- Nasum Ahmed
- Yasir Ali
- Parvez Hossain Emon
- Mahedi Hasan
- Tanzid Hasan
- Saif Hassan
- Mosaddek Hossain
- Rishad Hossain
- Shoriful Islam
- Hasan Mahmud
- Mustafizur Rahman
- Aliss Al Islam
- Najmul Hossain Shanto

Bracket

Quarter-finals
28 September – Nisshin
Pakistan | Abandoned
Hong Kong | Abandoned
29 September – Nisshin
Bangladesh | Abandoned
Malaysia | Abandoned
28 September – Nisshin
Afghanistan | Abandoned
India | Abandoned
29 September – Nisshin
Nepal | Abandoned
Sri Lanka | Abandoned

Semi-finals
1 October – Nisshin
Pakistan | 112/4 (11.3)
Bangladesh | 111/7 (13)
1 October – Nisshin
India | 169/7 (20)
Sri Lanka | 45 (9.5)

Gold medal match
3 October – Nisshin
Pakistan (silver) | 192/6 (20)
India (gold) | 211/6 (20)
Bronze medal match
3 October – Nisshin
Bangladesh | 102 (17.3)
Sri Lanka (bronze) | 165/9 (20)

Quarter-finals

Quarterfinal 4
29 September 2026
14:00
Scorecard

| Bangladesh | v | Malaysia |

Match abandoned
Kōrogi Sports Park, Nisshin
Umpires: Faisal Afridi (Pak) and Farooq Khan (Afg)

- No toss.
- No play was possible due to rain.
- Bangladesh advanced by virtue of being the higher-seeded team.

Semifinals

Semifinal 1
1 October 2026
09:00
Scorecard

| Bangladesh; 111/7 (13 overs) | v | Pakistan; 112/4 (11.3 overs) |
| Towhid Hridoy 42 (25); Sufyan Moqim 3/26 (3 overs) | | Abdul Samad 30* (15); Rishad Hossain 1/12 (2.3 overs) |

Pakistan won by 6 wickets
Kōrogi Sports Park, Nisshin
Umpires: Prageeth Rambukwella (SL) and Nitin Menon (Ind)

- Pakistan won the toss and elected to field.
- The match was reduced to 13 overs per side due to wet outfield.
- Sahibzada Farhan captained Pakistan for the first time in T20Is.

Bronze medal match

3 October 2026
09:00
Scorecard

| Sri Lanka; 165/9 (20 overs) | v | Bangladesh; 102 (17.3 overs) |
| Tharindu Rathnayake 65 (32); Mahedi Hasan 2/19 (4 overs) | | Nasum Ahmed 26 (28); Wanuja Sahan 2/17 (4 overs) |

Sri Lanka won by 63 runs
Kōrogi Sports Park, Nisshin
Umpires: Faisal Afridi (Pak) and Nitin Menon (Ind)

- Sri Lanka won the toss and elected to bat.
- Aliss Islam (Ban) made his T20I debut.

=== Women's tournament ===
Squad

- Nigar Sultana (c, wk)
- Nahida Akter (vc)
- Sharmin Akhter
- Dilara Akter (wk)
- Marufa Akter
- Shorna Akter
- Juairiya Ferdous (wk)
- Rabeya Khan
- Fahima Khatun
- Sultana Khatun
- Sanjida Akter Meghla
- Ritu Moni
- Sobhana Mostary
- Sharmin Sultana
- Fariha Trisna

Bracket

Quarter-finals
17 September – Nisshin
Bangladesh | Abandoned
China | Abandoned
18 September – Nisshin
Japan | 57 (19.5)
India | 59/2 (5)
17 September – Nisshin
Pakistan | 92/7 (10.4)
Thailand | 91/4 (11)
18 September – Nisshin
Malaysia | 74/7 (20)
Sri Lanka | 160/4 (20)

Semi-finals
20 September – Nisshin
Bangladesh | 81 (15.4)
India | 195/4 (20)
20 September – Nisshin
Pakistan | 177/4 (20 overs)
Sri Lanka | 178/2 (17.5)

Gold medal match
22 September – Nisshin
India (gold) | 216/3 (20)
Sri Lanka (silver) | 69 (15.4)
Bronze medal match
22 September – Nisshin
Bangladesh | 114/7 (20)
Pakistan (bronze) | 145/8 (20)

Quarter-finals

Quarter-final 1
17 September 2026
07:00
Scorecard

| Bangladesh | v | China |

Match abandoned
Kōrogi Sports Park, Nisshin
Umpires: Saleema Imtiaz (Pak) and Gayathri Venugopalan (Ind)

- No toss.
- No play was possible due to wet outfield.
- Bangladesh advanced by virtue of being the higher-seeded team.

Semi-finals

Semi-final 2
20 September 2026
14:00
Scorecard

| India; 195/4 (20 overs) | v | Bangladesh; 81 (15.4 overs) |
| Shafali Verma 100* (49); Sanjida Akter Meghla 1/25 (4 overs) | | Dilara Akter 27 (23); Deepti Sharma 3/7 (2.4 overs) |

India won by 114 runs
Kōrogi Sports Park, Nisshin
Umpires: Shivani Mishra (Qat) and Nimali Perera (SL)

- India won the toss and elected to bat.
- Shafali Verma (Ind) scored her maiden century in T20Is.
- Smriti Mandhana (Ind) became the leading run-scorer in women's T20Is (4788 runs), surpassing Suzie Bates' 4758 runs.

Bronze medal match

22 September 2026
09:00
Scorecard

| Pakistan; 145/8 (20 overs) | v | Bangladesh; 114/7 (20 overs) |
| Fatima Sana 45 (30); Shorna Akter 2/16 (3 overs) | | Sharmin Akhter 46 (45); Umm-e-Hani 3/10 (4 overs) |

Pakistan won by 31 runs
Kōrogi Sports Park, Nisshin
Umpires: Nimali Perera (SL) and Gayathri Venugopalan (Ind)

- Pakistan won the toss and elected to bat.

== Field hockey ==
Summary

Key:

- s.o. – Match decided by penalty-shootout.

| Team | Event | Group Stage | | | | | | Semi-final | Final / BM / Pl | | |
| Team | Event | Opposition Result | Opposition Result | Opposition Result | Opposition Result | Opposition Result | Rank | Opposition Result | Opposition Result | Opposition Result | Rank |
|---|---|---|---|---|---|---|---|---|---|---|---|
| Bangladesh men's | Men's tournament | South Korea; L 0–5 | Japan; L 1–6 | Sri Lanka; W 5–1 | Indonesia; W 3–1 | India; L 0–10 | 4 | Did not advance | China; L 1–7 | Thailand; W 3–0 | 7 |
| Bangladesh women's | Women's tournament | China; L 0–13 | Malaysia; L 1–3 | South Korea; L 0–8 | Kazakhstan; D 3–3 | Chinese Taipei; L 2–3 | 5 | Did not advance | Singapore; D 1–1 (2–1 s.o.) | – | 9 |

Men's tournament

Team squads

The following is the Bangladesh roster in the men's field hockey tournament of the 2026 Asian Games.

Head coach: (Germany) Gerhard Rach

2. Ashraful Islam
3. Farhad Ahmed
4. Khaled Rakin
6. Roman Sarkar (C)
7. Rashel Mahmud
9. Puskar Khisa
10. Mainul Islam
11. Rakibul Hasan
12. Obidul Joy
13. Rezaul Babu
14. Shahidur Saju
16. Md. Deen Emon
17. Amirul Islam
18. Hozifa Hossain
21. Ashraful Shad (GK)
22. Biplob Kujur (GK)
27. Mahbub Hossain
75. Md Shohanur Rahman

Preliminary round

| Pos | Team | Pld | W | D | L | GF | GA | GD | Pts | Qualification |
|---|---|---|---|---|---|---|---|---|---|---|
| 1 | India | 5 | 5 | 0 | 0 | 49 | 4 | +45 | 15 | Semi-finals |
| 2 | South Korea | 5 | 4 | 0 | 1 | 20 | 10 | +10 | 12 | Semi-finals |
| 3 | Japan (H) | 5 | 3 | 0 | 2 | 29 | 7 | +22 | 9 | Fifth place classification |
| 4 | Bangladesh | 5 | 2 | 0 | 3 | 9 | 23 | −14 | 6 | Fifth place classification |
| 5 | Sri Lanka | 5 | 1 | 0 | 4 | 6 | 38 | −32 | 3 | Ninth place game |
| 6 | Indonesia | 5 | 0 | 0 | 5 | 6 | 37 | −31 | 0 | Eleventh place game |

Source: FIH
Rules for classification: 1) points; 2) matches won; 3) goal difference; 4) goals for; 5) head-to-head result; 6) field goals for.
(H) Hosts

18 September 2026
11:00

| South Korea | 5–0 | Bangladesh |
|---|---|---|
| Bae 21'; Oh 21'; Lee G. 30'; Yang 32'; Sim 58' | Report |

Gifu Prefectural Green Stadium
Umpires:
Lim Hong-Zhen (SGP)
James Unkles (AUS)

22 September 2026
17:00

| Japan | 6–1 | Bangladesh |
|---|---|---|
| Kawabe 1', 58'; Yamasaki 6'; Kimura 15'; Watanabe 29'; Matsumoto 41' | Report | Rakin 44' |

Gifu Prefectural Green Stadium
Umpires:
Sean Rapaport (RSA)
Mazin Al-Shukaili (OMA)

24 September 2026
11:00

| Bangladesh | 5–1 | Sri Lanka |
|---|---|---|
| Am. Islam 8', 27'; As. Islam 16', 54'; Hossain 43' | Report | Weerappuli 18' |

Gifu Prefectural Green Stadium
Umpires:
Daulet Urmanov (KAZ)
Sean Rapaport (RSA)

26 September 2026
11:00

| Bangladesh | 3–1 | Indonesia |
|---|---|---|
| Am. Islam 11', 31'; Mahmud 37' | Report | Al Ardh 48' |

Gifu Prefectural Green Stadium
Umpires:
Haroon Rashid (PAK)
Coen van Bunge (NED)

28 September 2026
19:30

| India | 10–0 | Bangladesh |
|---|---|---|
| Abhishek 3'; Jugraj 22'; Harmanpreet 27', 40', 45'; Sukhjeet 32'; Lakra 44', 45'; Sanjay 59'; Mandeep 60' | Report |

Gifu Prefectural Green Stadium
Umpires:
Daulet Urmanov (KAZ)
Mazin Al-Shukaili (OMA)

Fifth place Crossover

1 October 2026
14:00

| China | 7–1 | Bangladesh |
|---|---|---|
| Zhang 2', 44'; Yulai 4'; Chen 24', 56', 59'; Gao 32' | Report | Hasan 30' |

Gifu Prefectural Green Stadium
Umpires:
Coen van Bunge (NED)
Hideki Kinoshita (JPN)

Seventh place match

3 October 2026
11:30

| Thailand | 0–3 | Bangladesh |
|---|---|---|
| | Report | Sarkar 3'; Am. Islam 27'; As. Islam 53' |

Gifu Prefectural Green Stadium
Umpires:
Hideki Kinoshita (JPN)
Deepak Joshi (IND)

Women's tournament

Team squads

The following is the Bangladesh roster in the women's field hockey tournament of the 2026 Asian Games.

Head coach: (Bangladesh) Zahid Hossain

1. Mohua (GK)
2. Neeladri Neel
3. Mst Annika
4. Ritu Akter
5. Ninisen Rakhain
6. Sanjida Moni
7. Sharika Rimon
8. Riyasha Rishi
9. Nadira
10. Orpita Pal (C)
11. Fardia Ratry
12. Airin Riya
13. Mst Lima
14. Mst Khatun
15. Kona Akter
16. Nadira Ema
17. Fatema Tuzzohora
18. Heemadri Sukh (GK)

Preliminary round

| Pos | Team | Pld | W | D | L | GF | GA | GD | Pts | Qualification |
|---|---|---|---|---|---|---|---|---|---|---|
| 1 | China | 5 | 5 | 0 | 0 | 46 | 0 | +46 | 15 | Semi-finals |
| 2 | South Korea | 5 | 4 | 0 | 1 | 20 | 5 | +15 | 12 | Semi-finals |
| 3 | Malaysia | 5 | 3 | 0 | 2 | 14 | 7 | +7 | 9 | Fifth place classification |
| 4 | Chinese Taipei | 5 | 2 | 0 | 3 | 8 | 21 | −13 | 6 | Fifth place classification |
| 5 | Bangladesh | 5 | 0 | 1 | 4 | 6 | 30 | −24 | 1 | Ninth place game |
| 6 | Kazakhstan | 5 | 0 | 1 | 4 | 4 | 35 | −31 | 1 | Eleventh place game |

Source: FIH
Rules for classification: 1) points; 2) matches won; 3) goal difference; 4) goals for; 5) head-to-head result; 6) field goals for.

20 September 2026
09:00

| China | 13–0 | Bangladesh |
|---|---|---|
| Zhong 4', 13', 29'; Chen Ya. 12', 18'; Li H. 13'; Zhang 27'; Ma 32'; Yang 36'; Zou 38', 51'; Chen Yi 41', 57' | Report |

Gifu Prefectural Green Stadium
Umpires:
Cookie Tan (SGP)
Shahiela Johari (MAS)

21 September 2026
19:00

| Bangladesh | 1–3 | Malaysia |
|---|---|---|
| Akter 25' | Report | Zulkifli 40', 59'; Muhamad 44' |

Gifu Prefectural Green Stadium
Umpires:
Yu Tian (CHN)
Kim Yoon-seon (KOR)

23 September 2026
09:00

| Bangladesh | 0–8 | South Korea |
|---|---|---|
| | Report | Choi 5', 19'; Park Seu. 12', 15', 23', 60'; Park Mi. 28'; Kim Seo. 34' |

Gifu Prefectural Green Stadium
Umpires:
Emi Yamada (JPN)
Zhou Fuyi (CHN)

25 September 2026
09:00

| Kazakhstan | 3–3 | Bangladesh |
|---|---|---|
| Lobanova 21', 32', 37' | Report | Riya 2'; Akter 40'; Pal 47' |

Gifu Prefectural Green Stadium
Umpires:
Shahiela Johari (MAS)
Kelly Hudson (NZL)

27 September 2026
13:00

| Chinese Taipei | 3–2 | Bangladesh |
|---|---|---|
| Huang 6', 49'; Wang Y. 45' | Report | Akter 19', 24' |

Gifu Prefectural Green Stadium
Umpires:
Yu Tian (CHN)
Rinky See (HKG)

Ninth place match

2 October 2026
09:00

| Bangladesh | 1–1 | Singapore |
|---|---|---|
| Riya 10' | Report; SO Report | Toh 44' |
Penalties
| Khatun (penalty shoot-out missed); Riya (penalty shoot-out missed); Ratry (penalty shoot-out scored); Ema (penalty shoot-out scored) | 2–1 | (penalty shoot-out missed) S. Ng; (penalty shoot-out missed) Ho; (penalty shoot-out scored) S. Ng; (penalty shoot-out missed) Sim; (penalty shoot-out missed) Chia |

Gifu Prefectural Green Stadium
Umpires:
Yu Tian (CHN)
Emi Yamada (JPN)

== Football ==
The Bangladesh women's national football team will make their second appearance in the Asian Games after debuting in the 2022 edition in Hangzhou, China. The Bangladesh football team will start their campaign on 14 September which is four days ahead of the opening ceremony.

Summary

Key:

- A.E.T – After extra time.
- P – Match decided by penalty-shootout.

| Team | Event | Group Stage | | | | Quarterfinals | Semifinals | Final / BM | |
| Team | Event | Opposition Score | Opposition Score | Opposition Score | Rank | Opposition Score | Opposition Score | Opposition Score | Rank |
|---|---|---|---|---|---|---|---|---|---|
| Bangladesh women's | Women's tournament | North Korea; L 0–10 | South Korea; L 0–6 | Myanmar; D 0–0 | 4 | Did not advance | | | 11 |

Team roster

The following players list is the Bangladesh squad for the 2026 Asian Games.

Head Coach: (England) Peter Butler

| No. | Pos. | Player | Date of birth (age) | Caps | Goals | Club |
|---|---|---|---|---|---|---|
| | GK | Rupna Chakma | 2 January 2004 (age 22) | 39 | 0 | (Bangladesh Football Federation) Rajshahi Stars |
| | GK | Swarna Rani Mandal | 6 June 2006 (age 20) | 2 | 0 | (Bangladesh Football Federation) Rajshahi Stars |
| | GK | Mile Akter | 14 September 2006 (age 20) | 8 | 0 | (Bangladesh Football Federation) Bangladesh Army |
| | DF | Sheuli Azim | 20 December 2001 (age 24) | 51 | 1 | (Bangladesh Football Federation) Rajshahi Stars |
| | DF | Shamsunnahar Sr. | 31 January 2003 (age 23) | 54 | 0 | (Bangladesh Football Federation) Farashganj SC |
| | DF | Afeida Khandaker | 18 November 2006 (age 19) | 30 | 4 | (Bangladesh Football Federation) Rajshahi Stars |
| | DF | Kohati Kisku | 5 September 2005 (age 21) | 23 | 2 | (Bangladesh Football Federation) Bangladesh Police |
| | DF | Mst Surovi Akter Arfin | 5 June 2008 (age 18) | 4 | 0 | (Bangladesh Football Federation) Bangladesh Army |
| | DF | Arpita Biswas | 7 May 2009 (age 17) | 0 | 0 | (Bangladesh Football Federation) Bangladesh Army |
| | DF | Unnoti Khatun | 30 December 2005 (age 20) | 1 | 0 | (Bangladesh Football Federation) Bangladesh Army |
| | DF | Surma Jannat | 1 January 2006 (age 20) | 1 | 0 | (Bangladesh Football Federation) Bangladesh Police |
| | MF | Maria Manda (C) | 10 May 2003 (age 23) | 53 | 1 | (Bangladesh Football Federation) Farashganj SC |
| | MF | Monika Chakma | 15 September 2003 (age 23) | 45 | 4 | (Bangladesh Football Federation) Farashganj SC |
| | MF | Momita Khatun | 1 December 2009 (age 16) | 4 | 0 | (Bangladesh Football Federation) Bangladesh Army |
| | MF | Anika Rania Siddiqui | 25 May 2005 (age 21) | 7 | 1 | (Swedish Football Association) Djursholm |
| | MF | Halima Akther | 6 April 2005 (age 21) | 6 | 0 | (Bangladesh Football Federation) Bangladesh Army |
| | FW | Tohura Khatun | 5 May 2003 (age 23) | 40 | 15 | (Bangladesh Football Federation) Farashganj SC |
| | FW | Umehla Marma | 14 August 2007 (age 19) | 11 | 1 | (Bangladesh Football Federation) Ansar & VDP |
| | FW | Sauravi Akanda Prity | 31 December 2009 (age 16) | 7 | 1 | (Bangladesh Football Federation) Rajshahi Stars |
| | FW | Ritu Porna Chakma | 30 December 2003 (age 22) | 42 | 15 | (Myanmar Football Federation) Ayeyawady |
| | FW | Shaheda Akter Ripa | 8 December 2005 (age 20) | 24 | 1 | (Bangladesh Football Federation) Rajshahi Stars |
| | FW | Mst Sagorika | 1 December 2007 (age 18) | 17 | 5 | (Bangladesh Football Federation) Bangladesh Police |
| | FW | Shamsunnahar Jr. | 30 March 2004 (age 22) | 38 | 8 | (Bangladesh Football Federation) Farashganj SC |

Preliminary Rounds – Group F

| Pos | Team | Pld | W | D | L | GF | GA | GD | Pts | Qualification |
|---|---|---|---|---|---|---|---|---|---|---|
| 1 | North Korea | 3 | 2 | 1 | 0 | 19 | 1 | +18 | 7 | Advance to knockout stage |
| 2 | South Korea | 3 | 2 | 1 | 0 | 12 | 1 | +11 | 7 | Advance to knockout stage |
| 3 | Myanmar | 3 | 0 | 1 | 2 | 0 | 13 | −13 | 1 | |
| 4 | Bangladesh | 3 | 0 | 1 | 2 | 0 | 16 | −16 | 1 | |

Source: Aichi–Nagoya 26
14 September 2026
16:00

| North Korea | 10–0 | Bangladesh |
|---|---|---|
| Jon Ryong-jong 5', 10'; Hwang Yu-yong 12'; Chae Un-yong 18', 35'; Kim Kyong-yong 40', 43'; Ri Song-a 51'; Jong Kum 60'; Han Jin-hong 90' | Report |

Nagai Stadium, Osaka
Attendance: 1,343
Referee: Plong Pich Akara (Cambodia)

17 September 2026
16:00

| Bangladesh | 0–6 | South Korea |
|---|---|---|
| | Report | Kim Min-ji 16'; Jeong Da-bin 42'; Choe Yu-ri 65'; Ji So-yun 77'; Hyun Seul-gi 79'; Ko Yoo-jin 90+1' |

Nagai Stadium, Osaka
Attendance: 135
Referee: Fatemeh Nasiri Looshani (Iran)

21 September 2026
16:00

| Bangladesh | 0–0 | Myanmar |
|---|---|---|
| | Report |

Nagai Stadium, Osaka
Attendance: 571
Referee: Roziyabonu Yusupova (Uzbekistan)

== Karate ==
Men

| Athlete | Event | Round of 16 | Quarterfinals | Semifinals | Repechage | Final / BM | |
| Athlete | Event | Opposition Result | Opposition Result | Opposition Result | Opposition Result | Opposition Result | Rank |
|---|---|---|---|---|---|---|---|
| Md Siam Hosen | –60 kg | Hari Sankar (MAS); L 0–5 | Did not advance | | | | |
| Md Monirul Islam | –67 kg | Al-Natsheh (QAT); L 3–8 | Did not advance | | | | |

Women

| Athlete | Event | Round of 16 | Quarterfinals | Semifinals | Repechage | Final / BM | |
| Athlete | Event | Opposition Result | Opposition Result | Opposition Result | Opposition Result | Opposition Result | Rank |
|---|---|---|---|---|---|---|---|
| Saiama Jaman | –50 kg | Bye | Chandran (MAS); L 4–5 | Did not advance | Fong MW (MAC); L 0–4 | Did not advance | |
| Humayra Akter Antora | –61 kg | Kanay (KAZ); L 1–9 | Did not advance | | Pürevjav (MGL); W 8–0 | Vann (CAM); L 0–5 | 5 |

== Shooting ==
=== Men ===
Individual

| Athlete | Event | Qualification | | Final | |
| Athlete | Event | Points | Rank | Points | Rank |
|---|---|---|---|---|---|
| Noor Alif | 10 m air pistol | 562-11x | 46 | Did not advance | |
| Saker Ahmed | 10 m air pistol | 558-7x | 51 | Did not advance | |
| Arnab Sharar | 10 m air rifle | 623.9 | 25 | Did not advance | |
| Rabbi Hasan Munna | 10 m air rifle | 621.3 | 32 | Did not advance | |
| Muhammad Robiul Islam | 10 m air rifle | 622.3 | 31 | Did not advance | |
| Muhammad Robiul Islam | 50 m rifle 3 position | 567-16x | 34 | Did not advance | |
| Abdullah Baki | 50 m rifle 3 position | 577-26x | 23 | Did not advance | |
| Yeausub Ali | 50 m rifle 3 position | 567-16x | 35 | Did not advance | |

Team

| Athlete | Event | Final | |
| Athlete | Event | Points | Rank |
|---|---|---|---|
| Arnab Sharar; Muhammad Robiul Islam; Rabbi Hasan Munna | 10 m air rifle | 1867.5 | 10 |
| Abdullah Baki; Muhammad Robiul Islam; Yeausub Ali | 50 m rifle 3 position | 1711-58x | 11 |

=== Women ===
Individual

| Athlete | Event | Qualification | | Final | |
| Athlete | Event | Points | Rank | Points | Rank |
|---|---|---|---|---|---|
| Anjila Amjad | 10 m air pistol | 562-17x | 36 | Did not advance | |
| Mehenaz Mim | 10 m air rifle | 619.1 | 46 | Did not advance | |
| Safa Bin Sahid | 10 m air rifle | 621.0 | 38 | Did not advance | |
| Sajida Haque | 10 m air rifle | 620.6 | 40 | Did not advance | |
| Sajida Haque | 50 m rifle 3 position | 561-12x | 45 | Did not advance | |
| Sayeda Atkia Hasan | 50 m rifle 3 position | 574-22x | 36 | Did not advance | |

Team

| Athlete | Event | Final | |
| Athlete | Event | Points | Rank |
|---|---|---|---|
| Mehenaz Mim; Sajida Haque; Safa Bin Sahid | 10 m air rifle | 1860.7 | 12 |

=== Mixed ===
Team

| Athlete | Event | Qualification | | Final | |
| Athlete | Event | Points | Rank | Points | Rank |
|---|---|---|---|---|---|
| Anjila Amjad; Saker Ahmed | 10 m air pistol | 558-15x | 19 | Did not advance | |
| Mehenaz Mim; Muhammad Robiul Islam | 10 m air rifle | 617.7 | 12 | Did not advance | |

== Table tennis ==
Men

| Athlete | Event | Round of 64 | Round of 32 | Round of 16 | Quarterfinal | Semifinal | Final | |
| Athlete | Event | Opposition Result | Opposition Result | Opposition Result | Opposition Result | Opposition Result | Opposition Result | Rank |
|---|---|---|---|---|---|---|---|---|
| Mohutasin Ridoy | Singles | Ankhbayar (MGL); L 2–4 | Did not advance | | | | | |
| Ramhimlian Bawm | Singles | Saleh (BRN); L 1–4 | Did not advance | | | | | |
| Mohutasin Ridoy; Ramhimlian Bawm | Doubles | Zheng HW / Chan CI (MAC); L 0–3 | Did not advance | | | | | |

Women

| Athlete | Event | Round of 64 | Round of 32 | Round of 16 | Quarterfinal | Semifinal | Final | |
| Athlete | Event | Opposition Result | Opposition Result | Opposition Result | Opposition Result | Opposition Result | Opposition Result | Rank |
|---|---|---|---|---|---|---|---|---|
| Nowrin Mahi | Singles | Nazim (CHN); L 2–4 | Did not advance | | | | | |
| Sonam Soma | Singles | Leong ON (CHN); L 0–4 | Did not advance | | | | | |
| Nowrin Mahi; Samantha Tusi | Doubles | Kim K-y / Cha Su-yong (PRK); L 0–3 | Did not advance | | | | | |

Mixed

| Athlete | Event | Round of 64 | Round of 32 | Round of 16 | Quarterfinal | Semifinal | Final | |
| Athlete | Event | Opposition Result | Opposition Result | Opposition Result | Opposition Result | Opposition Result | Opposition Result | Rank |
|---|---|---|---|---|---|---|---|---|
| Mohutasin Ridoy; Nowrin Mahi | Doubles | Xaysavath / Sisomboun (LAO); W 3–1 | Preechayan / Vijitviriyagul (THA); L 0–3 | Did not advance | | | | |

Team

| Athlete | Event | Group stage | | | | Round of 16 | Quarterfinal | Semifinal | Final | |
| Athlete | Event | Opposition Score | Opposition Score | Opposition Score | Rank | Opposition Score | Opposition Score | Opposition Score | Opposition Score | Rank |
|---|---|---|---|---|---|---|---|---|---|---|
| Imrul Imon; Mohutasin Ridoy; Ramhimlian Bawm | Men's | Kazakhstan; L 0–3 | Laos; L 1–3 | Singapore; L 0–3 | 4 | Did not advance | | | | |
| Nowrin Mahi; Samanta Tushi; Sonam Soma | Women's | Chinese Taipei; L 0–3 | North Korea; L 0–3 | —N/a | 3 | Did not advance | | | | |

== Volleyball ==
=== Beach Volleyball ===
| Athletes | Event | Preliminary round | | | | Round of 16 | Quarterfinal | Semifinal | Final / BM | |
| Athletes | Event | Opposition Score | Opposition Score | Opposition Score | Rank | Opposition Score | Opposition Score | Opposition Score | Opposition Score | Rank |
|---|---|---|---|---|---|---|---|---|---|---|
| Murammar Shaikat; Ratul Ahmed | Men's | Kurosawa / Mizumachi (JPN); L 0–2 (11–21, 15–21) | Khakizadeh / Ghalehnovi (IRI); L 0–2 (13–21, 12–21) | Adam / Ismail (MDV); W 2–1 (13-21, 21-19, 17-15) | 3 | Did not advance | | | | 17 |
| Mst Lucky Khatun; Mst Sabina Khatun | Women's | Pons / Rondina (PHI); L 0–2 (6–21, 6–21) | Kozhakhmet / Kabulbekova (KAZ); L 0–2 (6–21, 2–21) | —N/a | 3 | Did not advance | | | | 17 |

Source: Men's, Women's
