= Bangladesh at the 1978 Asian Games =

- IOC code: BAN
- NOC: Bangladesh Olympic Association

in Bangkok
- Medals: Gold 0 Silver 0 Bronze 0 Total 0

Asian Games appearances (overview)
- 1978; 1982; 1986; 1990; 1994; 1998; 2002; 2006; 2010; 2014; 2018; 2022; 2026

Bangladesh participated in the 1978 Asian Games which were held in Bangkok, Thailand from December 9, 1978, to December 20, 1978.

== Football ==
=== Group C ===
Team	Pld	W	D	L	GF	GA	GD	Pts
Malaysia	2	2	0	0	2	0	+2	4
India	2	1	0	1	3	1	+2	2
Bangladesh	2	0	0	2	0	4	−4	0

December 12

Bangladesh	0–1	Malaysia

Bangkok

December 14

Bangladesh	0–3	India

Bangkok
- Bangladesh did not advance in next stage.

== Field hockey ==
=== Men ===
==== Group B ====
Team	Pld	W	D	L	GF	GA	GD	Pts
Pakistan	3	3	0	0	28	0	+28	6
Japan	3	1	1	1	5	2	+3	3
Thailand	3	0	2	1	2	11	−9	2
Bangladesh	3	0	1	2	2	24	−22	1

December 11

Pakistan	17–0	Bangladesh

Bangkok

December 13

Japan	5–0	Bangladesh

Bangkok

December 15

Bangladesh	2–2	Thailand

Bangkok

==== 5th place match ====
December 16

Bangladesh	0–1	Hong Kong

Bangkok

- Bangladesh ranked 6th in the field hockey.

== Volleyball ==
=== Men ===
==== Group B ====
Team	Pld	W	D	L	SF	SA	Diff	Pts
Japan	4	4	0	0	12	0	+12	8
Kuwait	4	3	0	1	9	3	+6	6
Bangladesh	4	2	0	2	6	7	−1	4
United Arab Emirates	4	1	0	3	4	9	−5	2
Nepal	4	0	0	4	0	12	−12	0

1978-12-10	Japan	3–0	Bangladesh	Bangkok

1978-12-11	Bangladesh	3–1	United Arab Emirates	Bangkok

1978-12-13	Bangladesh	3–0	Nepal	Bangkok

1978-12-14	Kuwait	3–0	Bangladesh	Bangkok

- Bangladesh did not advance in next stage.

==== Classification 7th–12th ====
1978-12-17	Saudi Arabia	3–0	Bangladesh	Bangkok

1978-12-18	Bangladesh	3–0	United Arab Emirates	Bangkok

- Bangladesh ranked 11th in the Volleyball.

== Wrestling ==
- Jalil Abdul competed in +100.0 weight class in 1978-12-11 and stood 5th.

== See also ==
- Bangladesh at the Asian Games
- Bangladesh at the Olympics
