= Wushu at the 2026 Asian Games – Women's sanda 52 kg =

Women's sanda 52 kg at the 2026 Asian Games
- Venue: Aichi Budokan
- Dates: 20–24 September 2026
- Competitors: 15 from 15 nations

Medalists
gold medal	Wu Di	China
silver medal	Sogand Sinkaei	Iran
bronze medal	Jinnat Akter	Bangladesh
bronze medal	Chan Tsz Ching	Hong Kong

The women's sanda 52 kilograms competition at the 2026 Asian Games in Nagoya, Japan was held from 20 to 24 September 2026 at the Aichi Prefectural Martial Arts Hall.

Competition bouts consist of 3 rounds in total, each lasting two minutes with a one-minute rest period between rounds. The athlete who scores more points in each round is the winner of that rounds; the bout ends when one athlete has won two rounds (and thus the match).

A total of fifteen competitors from fifteen countries (NOCs) competed in this event, limited to fighters whose body weight was less than 52 kilograms. Wu Di from China won the gold medal.

== Schedule ==
All times are Japan Standard Time (UTC+09:00)

Date	Time	Event
Sunday, 20 September 2026	18:00	1/8 finals
Tuesday, 22 September 2026	18:00	Quarterfinals
Wednesday, 23 September 2026	18:00	Semifinals
Thursday, 24 September 2026	09:30	Final

== Results ==
Legend

- PD — Won by point difference
- WO — Won by walkover

1/8 finals
Jenifer Kilapio (PHI)	0
Tharisa Dea Florentina (INA)	2
Alisa Xaiyasit (LAO)	2
Farogat Nurmamatova (UZB)	0
Wu Di (CHN)	2
Gwon Mun-yeong (KOR)	0
Pürevjavyn Davaajargal (MGL)
Ngô Thị Phương Nga (VIE)	PD
Sogand Sinkaei (IRI)	2
Aparna Dahiya (IND)	0
Bibimerýem Akmuhammedowa (TKM)	0
Ayan Tursyn (KAZ)	2
Chan Tsz Ching (HKG)	2
Chen Si-yun (TPE)	0

Quarterfinals
Jinnat Akter (BAN)	WO
Tharisa Dea Florentina (INA)
Alisa Xaiyasit (LAO)
Wu Di (CHN)	PD
Ngô Thị Phương Nga (VIE)	0
Sogand Sinkaei (IRI)	2
Ayan Tursyn (KAZ)	0
Chan Tsz Ching (HKG)	2

Semifinals
Jinnat Akter (BAN)
Wu Di (CHN)	PD
Sogand Sinkaei (IRI)	2
Chan Tsz Ching (HKG)	0

Final
Wu Di (CHN)	2
Sogand Sinkaei (IRI)	0
