= Bangladesh at the 1982 Asian Games =

- IOC code: BAN
- NOC: Bangladesh Olympic Association

in New Delhi
- Medals Ranked 20th: Gold 0 Silver 0 Bronze 0 Total 0

Asian Games appearances (overview)
- 1978; 1982; 1986; 1990; 1994; 1998; 2002; 2006; 2010; 2014; 2018; 2022; 2026

Bangladesh participated in the 1982 Asian Games which were held at Talkatora Swimming Pool in Delhi, India from November 19, 1982, to December 4, 1982.

== Football ==
=== Group C ===
Team	Pld	W	D	L	GF	GA	GD	Pts
India	3	2	1	0	5	2	+3	5
China	3	2	1	0	4	2	+2	5
Bangladesh	3	1	0	2	2	4	-2	2
Malaysia	3	0	0	3	1	4	-3	0

November 20, 1982

India	2 – 0	Bangladesh
Prasun Banerjee 1', 90+5'

Nehru Stadium

November 22, 1982

China	1 – 0	Bangladesh
Huang Xiangdong 22'

November 24, 1982

Bangladesh	2 – 1	Malaysia
Ashish Bhadra (?); Badal Roy (?)		? (?)

- Bangladesh did not advance in the next stage.

== Field hockey ==
=== Men ===
==== Group A ====
Team	Pld	W	D	L	GF	GA	GD	Pts
India	4	4	0	0	37	1	8	
Malaysia	4	3	0	1	8	5	6	
Oman	4	1	0	3	4	15	2	
Bangladesh	4	1	0	3	4	16	2	
Hong Kong	4	1	0	3	6	22	2	

November 20

Oman	2–1	Bangladesh

November 23

India	12–10	Bangladesh

November 24

Bangladesh	3–2	Hong Kong

November 25

Malaysia	v	Bangladesh

==== Classification 5th–8th ====
November 29

Bangladesh	v	China

- China beat Bangladesh in field hockey.

===== 7th place match =====
November 30

Bangladesh	3–1	Hong Kong

- Bangladesh ranked 7th in the field hockey.

== Volleyball ==
=== Men ===
==== Group A ====
Team	Pld	W	D	L	SF	SA	Diff	Pts
India	3	3	0	0	9	2	+7	6
Indonesia	3	2	0	1	7	4	+3	4
Saudi Arabia	3	1	0	2	5	6	−1	2
Bangladesh	3	0	0	3	0	9	−9	0

November 19	India	3–0	Bangladesh

November 22	Indonesia	3–0	Bangladesh

November 24	Saudi Arabia	3–0	Bangladesh

- Bangladesh did not advance in the next stage and ranked 14th in Volleyball.

== Water polo ==
=== Men ===
==== Group B ====
Team	Pld	W	D	L	GF	GA	GD	Pts
Japan	3	3	0	0	70	7	+63	6
Singapore	3	2	0	1	57	23	+34	4
Saudi Arabia	3	1	0	2	17	60	−43	2
Bangladesh	3	0	0	3	15	69	−54	0

November 20	Japan	33–0	Bangladesh	Talkatora Swimming Pool, New Delhi

November 21	Saudi Arabia	12–11	Bangladesh	Talkatora Swimming Pool, New Delhi

November 23	Singapore	24–4	Bangladesh	Talkatora Swimming Pool, New Delhi

- Bangladesh did not advance in the next stage.

== See also ==
- Bangladesh at the Asian Games
- Bangladesh at the Olympics
