= Bangladesh at the 1994 Asian Games =

- IOC code: BAN
- NOC: Bangladesh Olympic Association

in Hiroshima
- Medals Ranked 28th: Gold 0 Silver 1 Bronze 0 Total 1

Asian Games appearances (overview)
- 1978; 1982; 1986; 1990; 1994; 1998; 2002; 2006; 2010; 2014; 2018; 2022; 2026

Bangladesh participated in the 1994 Asian Games which were held from October 2 to October 16, 1994, in Hiroshima, Japan.

== Medalists ==
Medal	Name	Sport	Event
Silver	National team	Kabaddi	Men's Team

== Boxing ==
Men

Athlete	Event	Round of 16	Quarterfinals	Semifinals	Final	
Athlete	Event	Opposition Score	Opposition Score	Opposition Score	Opposition Score	Rank
R. Amin (BAN)	Light flyweight	Abdul Rashid Qambrani (PAK) L RSC	did not advance			
Kazi Shadat Hossain (BAN)	Flyweight	Ali Muhammad Qambrani (PAK) L 14–17	did not advance			
Aslam Hussain (BAN)	Bantamweight	Gurmeet Singh (IND) L 1–30	did not advance			
Md Delwar Hossain (BAN)	Welterweight	Nariman Ataev (UZB) L RSC	did not advance			
Md Harunur Rashid (BAN)	Middleweight	Arkadiy Topayev (KAZ) L RSC	did not advance			
Mohammad Alauddin (BAN)	Heavyweight	Chae Sung-bae (KOR) L RSC	did not advance			

== Field hockey ==
=== Men ===
==== Group B ====
Team	Pld	W	D	L	GF	GA	GD	Pts
India	3	3	0	0	7	1	+6	6
South Korea	3	2	0	1	15	3	+12	4
China	3	1	0	2	1	7	−6	2
Bangladesh	3	0	0	3	0	12	−18	0

October 4
14:00

India	1–0	Bangladesh

Regional Park, Hiroshima

October 7
18:00

South Korea	10–0	Bangladesh

Regional Park, Hiroshima

October 10
12:00

Bangladesh	0–1	China

Regional Park, Hiroshima

==== Classification 5th–8th ====
October 12

Bangladesh	0–4	Kazakhstan

Regional Park, Hiroshima

===== 7th place match =====
October 13

China	2–1	Bangladesh

Regional Park, Hiroshima

- Bangladesh ranked 7th in the field hockey.

== Kabaddi ==
All times are Japan Standard Time (UTC+09:00)

Rank	Team	Pld	W	D	L	PF	PA	PD	Pts
1st place, gold medalist(s)	India	4	4	0	0	227	78	+149	8
2nd place, silver medalist(s)	Bangladesh	4	3	0	1	100	91	+9	6
3rd place, bronze medalist(s)	Pakistan	4	2	0	2	153	90	+63	4
	Japan	4	1	0	3	90	159	−69	2
	Nepal	4	0	0	4	78	230	−152	0

October 12; 11:00	Bangladesh	44–14	Nepal	Shudo University Ground, Hiroshima

October 12; 15:00	Japan	19–25	Bangladesh	Shudo University Ground, Hiroshima

October 13; 11:00	India	39–10	Bangladesh	Shudo University Ground, Hiroshima

October 13; 14:00	Bangladesh	21–19	Pakistan	Shudo University Ground, Hiroshima

== See also ==
- Bangladesh at the Asian Games
- Bangladesh at the Olympics
