= Bangladesh at the 1986 Asian Games =

- IOC code: BAN
- NOC: Bangladesh Olympic Association

in Seoul
- Medals Ranked 21st: Gold 0 Silver 0 Bronze 1 Total 1

Asian Games appearances (overview)
- 1978; 1982; 1986; 1990; 1994; 1998; 2002; 2006; 2010; 2014; 2018; 2022; 2026

Bangladesh participated in the 1986 Asian Games which was held in Seoul, South Korea from 20 September to 5 October 1986. It received one bronze medal, ranking 21st in the medal total.

== Medalists ==
| Medal | Name | Sport | Event |
|---|---|---|---|
| Bronze | Mosharraf Hossain | Boxing | Light heavyweight (81 kg) |

== Boxing ==
- Mosharraf Hossain won bronze medal in boxing Light heavyweight (81 kg) event.

== Football ==
=== Group D ===
| Team | Pld | W | D | L | GF | GA | GD | Pts |
|---|---|---|---|---|---|---|---|---|
| Kuwait | 4 | 4 | 0 | 0 | 12 | 0 | +12 | 8 |
| Iran | 4 | 3 | 0 | 1 | 12 | 1 | +11 | 6 |
| Japan | 4 | 2 | 0 | 2 | 9 | 4 | +5 | 4 |
| Bangladesh | 4 | 1 | 0 | 3 | 1 | 12 | −11 | 2 |
| Nepal | 4 | 0 | 0 | 4 | 0 | 17 | −17 | 0 |

20 September

| Kuwait | 4–0 | Bangladesh |
|---|---|---|
| Al-Ghanim 24'; Al-Hajeri 43'; Abbas 51'; H. Al-Shemmari 64' |

Daejeon Stadium, Daejeon

24 September

| Iran | 4–0 | Bangladesh |
|---|---|---|
| Pious 61'; Fathabadi 82', 89'; Ghayeghran 90' |

Daejeon Stadium, Daejeon

26 September

| Nepal | 0–1 | Bangladesh |
|---|---|---|
| | | Aslam 48' |

Daejeon Stadium, Daejeon

28 September

| Japan | 4–0 | Bangladesh |
|---|---|---|
| Hara 1', 71'; Johnny 56' (o.g.); Tsunami 78' |

Daejeon Stadium, Daejeon
- Bangladesh did not advance in next stage and ranked 14th.

== Field hockey ==
=== Men ===
==== Group B ====
| Team | Pld | W | D | L | GF | GA | GD | Pts |
|---|---|---|---|---|---|---|---|---|
| Malaysia | 3 | 3 | 0 | 0 | 15 | 5 | +10 | 6 |
| Pakistan | 3 | 2 | 0 | 1 | 20 | 2 | +18 | 4 |
| Bangladesh | 3 | 1 | 0 | 2 | 3 | 11 | −8 | 2 |
| Oman | 3 | 0 | 0 | 3 | 4 | 24 | −20 | 0 |

22 September

| Bangladesh | 1–3 | Malaysia |

Seongnam Stadium, Seongnam

24 September

| Bangladesh | 0–7 | Pakistan |

Seongnam Stadium, Seongnam

26 September

| Bangladesh | 2–1 | Oman |

Seongnam Stadium, Seongnam

==== Classification 5th–8th ====
28 September

| Bangladesh | 1–2 | Hong Kong |

Seongnam Stadium, Seongnam

===== 7th place match =====
29 September

| Oman | 2–4 | Bangladesh |

Seongnam Stadium, Seongnam

- Bangladesh ranked 7th in the field hockey.

== See also ==
- Bangladesh at the Asian Games
- Bangladesh at the Olympics
