= Shooting at the 2014 Asian Games – Women's 10 metre air pistol team =

Women's 10 metre air pistol team at the 2014 Asian Games
- Venue: Ongnyeon International Shooting Range
- Dates: 20 September 2014
- Competitors: 42 from 14 nations

Medalists
| gold medal | China; Guo Wenjun, Zhang Mengyuan, Zhou Qingyuan |
| silver medal | Chinese Taipei; Tien Chia-chen, Tu Yi Yi-tzu, Wu Chia-ying |
| bronze medal | Mongolia; Tömörchödöriin Bayartsetseg, Otryadyn Gündegmaa, Tsogbadrakhyn Mönkhzul |

The women's 10 metre air pistol team competition at the 2014 Asian Games in Incheon, South Korea was held on 20 September at the Ongnyeon International Shooting Range.

== Schedule ==
All times are Korea Standard Time (UTC+09:00)

| Date | Time | Event |
|---|---|---|
| Saturday, 20 September 2014 | 08:00 | Final |

== Records ==
Prior to this competition, the existing world, Asian and Games records were as follows.

| World Record | Russia | 1161 | Brno, Czech Republic | 5 August 1993 |
| Asian Record | China | 1161 | Doha, Qatar | 3 December 2006 |
| Games Record | China | 1161 | Doha, Qatar | 3 December 2006 |

== Results ==
| Rank | Team | Series | | | | Total | Xs | Notes |
| Rank | Team | 1 | 2 | 3 | 4 | Total | Xs | Notes |
|---|---|---|---|---|---|---|---|---|
| 1st place, gold medalist(s) | China (CHN) | 283 | 290 | 284 | 289 | 1146 | 32 | |
| | Guo Wenjun | 94 | 97 | 95 | 98 | 384 | 9 | |
| | Zhang Mengyuan | 95 | 96 | 94 | 96 | 381 | 12 | |
| | Zhou Qingyuan | 94 | 97 | 95 | 95 | 381 | 11 | |
| 2nd place, silver medalist(s) | Chinese Taipei (TPE) | 289 | 283 | 284 | 285 | 1141 | 23 | |
| | Tien Chia-chen | 96 | 92 | 96 | 94 | 378 | 7 | |
| | Tu Yi Yi-tzu | 96 | 95 | 94 | 95 | 380 | 10 | |
| | Wu Chia-ying | 97 | 96 | 94 | 96 | 383 | 6 | |
| 3rd place, bronze medalist(s) | Mongolia (MGL) | 276 | 285 | 291 | 288 | 1140 | 35 | |
| | Tömörchödöriin Bayartsetseg | 90 | 93 | 99 | 95 | 377 | 12 | |
| | Otryadyn Gündegmaa | 91 | 99 | 98 | 94 | 382 | 13 | |
| | Tsogbadrakhyn Mönkhzul | 95 | 93 | 94 | 99 | 381 | 10 | |
| 4 | South Korea (KOR) | 282 | 286 | 286 | 286 | 1140 | 29 | |
| | Jung Jee-hae | 95 | 95 | 96 | 98 | 384 | 9 | |
| | Kim Jang-mi | 94 | 98 | 98 | 94 | 384 | 13 | |
| | Oh Min-kyung | 93 | 93 | 92 | 94 | 372 | 7 | |
| 5 | India (IND) | 282 | 287 | 280 | 285 | 1134 | 33 | |
| | Shweta Chaudhary | 97 | 94 | 97 | 95 | 383 | 13 | |
| | Malaika Goel | 91 | 96 | 91 | 95 | 373 | 8 | |
| | Heena Sidhu | 94 | 97 | 92 | 95 | 378 | 12 | |
| 6 | Singapore (SIN) | 279 | 288 | 277 | 286 | 1130 | 27 | |
| | Nicole Tan | 92 | 94 | 91 | 95 | 372 | 7 | |
| | Teh Xiu Hong | 96 | 97 | 92 | 96 | 381 | 10 | |
| | Teo Shun Xie | 91 | 97 | 94 | 95 | 377 | 10 | |
| 7 | Thailand (THA) | 282 | 282 | 283 | 279 | 1126 | 31 | |
| | Pim-on Klaisuban | 95 | 93 | 97 | 95 | 380 | 12 | |
| | Princhuda Methaweewong | 93 | 96 | 93 | 92 | 374 | 9 | |
| | Naphaswan Yangpaiboon | 94 | 93 | 93 | 92 | 372 | 10 | |
| 8 | Vietnam (VIE) | 283 | 280 | 276 | 281 | 1120 | 25 | |
| | Đặng Lê Ngọc Mai | 91 | 96 | 87 | 93 | 367 | 8 | |
| | Lê Thị Hoàng Ngọc | 97 | 92 | 93 | 95 | 377 | 8 | |
| | Triệu Thị Hoa Hồng | 95 | 92 | 96 | 93 | 376 | 9 | |
| 9 | Iran (IRI) | 277 | 276 | 282 | 281 | 1116 | 25 | |
| | Sarina Gharabat | 91 | 91 | 94 | 92 | 368 | 8 | |
| | Elham Harijani | 91 | 92 | 96 | 93 | 372 | 7 | |
| | Sara Mirabi | 95 | 93 | 92 | 96 | 376 | 10 | |
| 10 | Kazakhstan (KAZ) | 274 | 282 | 274 | 281 | 1111 | 20 | |
| | Zauresh Baibussinova | 93 | 92 | 93 | 92 | 370 | 8 | |
| | Yuliya Drishlyuk | 93 | 95 | 89 | 95 | 372 | 7 | |
| | Yuliya Komendra | 88 | 95 | 92 | 94 | 369 | 5 | |
| 11 | Japan (JPN) | 283 | 276 | 276 | 276 | 1111 | 13 | |
| | Yoko Inada | 92 | 90 | 90 | 93 | 365 | 6 | |
| | Yukari Konishi | 97 | 90 | 94 | 89 | 370 | 2 | |
| | Kinuko Sato | 94 | 96 | 92 | 94 | 376 | 5 | |
| 12 | Bangladesh (BAN) | 274 | 271 | 273 | 278 | 1096 | 19 | |
| | Armin Asha | 95 | 93 | 89 | 92 | 369 | 9 | |
| | Ardina Ferdous | 88 | 94 | 91 | 92 | 365 | 5 | |
| | Sinthia Naznin Tumpa | 91 | 84 | 93 | 94 | 362 | 5 | |
| 13 | Qatar (QAT) | 268 | 268 | 268 | 273 | 1077 | 11 | |
| | Al-Dana Al-Mubarak | 90 | 89 | 91 | 88 | 358 | 3 | |
| | Nasra Mohammed | 92 | 89 | 89 | 92 | 362 | 4 | |
| | Hanadi Salem | 86 | 90 | 88 | 93 | 357 | 4 | |
| 14 | Macau (MAC) | 261 | 261 | 250 | 252 | 1024 | 9 | |
| | Chao Wa Kuan | 86 | 88 | 83 | 85 | 342 | 5 | |
| | Cheong Lok Si | 85 | 85 | 83 | 81 | 334 | 1 | |
| | Vong Iok In | 90 | 88 | 84 | 86 | 348 | 3 | |
