= Bangladesh at the 1990 Asian Games =

- IOC code: BAN
- NOC: Bangladesh Olympic Association

in Beijing
- Medals Ranked 20th: Gold 0 Silver 1 Bronze 0 Total 1

Asian Games appearances (overview)
- 1978; 1982; 1986; 1990; 1994; 1998; 2002; 2006; 2010; 2014; 2018; 2022; 2026

Bangladesh participated in the 1990 Asian Games which were held in Beijing, China from September 22 to October 7, 1990.

== Medalists ==
Medal	Name	Sport	Event
Silver	National team	Kabaddi	Men's Team

== Football ==
=== Group D ===
Team	Pld	W	D	L	GF	GA	GD	Pts
Saudi Arabia	2	2	0	0	6	0	+6	4
Japan	2	1	0	1	3	2	+1	2
Bangladesh	2	0	0	2	0	7	−7	0

24 September

Saudi Arabia	4–0	Bangladesh
Abdulshakoor 11'; Abdullah 12', 80' (pen.); Al-Bishi 73'

Xiannongtan Stadium, Beijing
Referee: Robert Lee (Singapore)

26 September

Bangladesh	0–3	Japan
		Hashiratani 4' (pen.); Hasegawa 26', 60'

Fengtai Stadium, Beijing
Referee: Kim In-soo (South Korea)
- Bangladesh did not advance in next stage and ranked 13th.

== Kabaddi ==
Rank	Team	Pld	W	D	L	PF	PA	PD	Pts
1st place, gold medalist(s)	India	5	5	0	0	234	84	+150	10
2nd place, silver medalist(s)	Bangladesh	5	3	1	1	116	121	−5	7
3rd place, bronze medalist(s)	Pakistan	5	3	1	1	116	112	+4	7
	China	5	1	0	4	89	149	−59	2
	Japan	5	1	0	4	84	130	−46	2
	Nepal	5	1	0	4	97	141	−44	2

23 September	Bangladesh	23–19	Nepal	Teachers College of Physical Education, Beijing

24 September	Pakistan	23–23	Bangladesh	Teachers College of Physical Education, Beijing

25 September	China	12–35	Bangladesh	Teachers College of Physical Education, Beijing

27 September	Japan	15–18	Bangladesh	Teachers College of Physical Education, Beijing

28 September	India	52–17	Bangladesh	Teachers College of Physical Education, Beijing

- Since both Pakistan and Bangladesh were tied on points, a play-off game was played to decide the 2nd team.

28 September	Pakistan	18–19	Bangladesh	Teachers College of Physical Education, Beijing

== See also ==
- Bangladesh at the Asian Games
- Bangladesh at the Olympics
