= Bangladesh at the 2022 Asian Games =

- IOC code: BAN
- NOC: Bangladesh Olympic Association

in Hangzhou, China 23 September 2023 – 8 October 2023
- Competitors: 180 in 17 sports
- Flag bearers (opening): Sabina Khatun; GM Niaz Murshed
- Flag bearer (closing): Saif Hassan
- Officials: 60
- Medals Ranked 37th: Gold 0 Silver 0 Bronze 2 Total 2

Asian Games appearances (overview)
- 1978; 1982; 1986; 1990; 1994; 1998; 2002; 2006; 2010; 2014; 2018; 2022; 2026

Bangladesh competed at the 2022 Asian Games in Hangzhou, Zhejiang, China, from 22 September 2023 to 8 October 2023. Earlier the event was scheduled to be held in September–October 2022, but due to COVID-19 pandemic cases rising in China, the event was postponed and rescheduled to September–October 2023.

== Competitors ==
Sport	Men	Women	Total
Aquatics	1	1	2
Archery	8	8	16
Athletics	1	0	1
Cricket	15	15	30
Fencing	0	3	3
Football	22	22	44
Golf	2	0	2
Kabaddi	12	12	24
Karate	2	3	5
Shooting	8	7	15
Taekwondo	2	1	3
Weightlifting	1	2	3
Boxing	2	1	3
Field hockey	18	0	18
Chess	4	1	5
Gymnastics	2	0	2
Bridge	4	0	4

== Medal summary ==
=== Medals by sport ===
Sport	1st place, gold medalist(s)	2nd place, silver medalist(s)	3rd place, bronze medalist(s)	Total
Cricket	0	0	2	2

=== Medals by day ===
Day	Date	1st place, gold medalist(s)	2nd place, silver medalist(s)	3rd place, bronze medalist(s)	Total
Day 1	24 September	0	0	0	0
Day 2	25 September	0	0	1	1
Day 3	26 September	0	0	0	0
Day 4	27 September	0	0	0	0
Day 5	28 September	0	0	0	0
Day 6	29 September	0	0	0	0

== Archery ==
Each team was allowed to have 2 athletes in knockout stages in individual events.

=== Recurve ===
Athlete	Event	Ranking round			Round of 64	Round of 32	Round of 16	Quarterfinals	Semifinals	Final / BM	
Athlete	Event	Score	Rank	Seed	Opposition Score	Opposition Score	Opposition Score	Opposition Score	Opposition Score	Opposition Score	Rank
Hakim Ahmed Rubel	Men's individual	648	35	22 Q	Ashkanani (QAT); W 6–0	Golshani (IRI); W 6–0	Bommadevara (IND); L 5^{8}–6^{10}	Did not advance to next round			
Ramakrishna Saha	Men's individual	653	29	—N/a	Did not advance to next round						
Ruman Shana	Men's individual	648	34	—N/a	Did not advance to next round						
Sagor Islam	Men's individual	662	22	16 Q	Kursanaliev (KGZ); W 7–1	Baasith (INA); L 0–6	Did not advance to next round				
Ruman Shana; Sagor Islam; Hakim Ahmed Rubel	Men's team	1963	7 Q		—N/a		Vietnam (VIE); W 5^{28}–4^{25}	Thailand (THA); W 5^{28}–4^{27}	India (IND); L 3–5	Indonesia (INA); L 0–6	4
Diya Siddique	Women's individual										
Beauti Roy	Women's individual										
Fahmida Sultana Nisha	Women's individual										
Sima Akter Shimu	Women's individual										
Beauti Roy; Diya Siddique; Fahmida Sultana Nisha	Women's team										

== Athletics ==
=== Men ===
Track and road events

Event	Athletes	Heats		Semifinal		Final	
Event	Athletes	Time	Rank	Time	Rank	Time	Rank
100 m	Imranur Rahman	10.44	3Q	10.42	6	Did not advance	

== Cricket ==
Team	Event	Group Stage			Quarterfinal	Semifinal	Final / BM	
Team	Event	Opposition Result	Opposition Result	Rank	Opposition Result	Opposition Result	Opposition Result	Rank
Bangladesh women's	Women's tournament	BYE			Hong Kong; W NR	India; L 8 wickets	Pakistan; W 5 wickets	3rd place, bronze medalist(s)
Bangladesh men's	Men's tournament	BYE			Malaysia; W 2 runs	India; L 9 wickets	Pakistan; W 17 runs	3rd place, bronze medalist(s)

== Football(Soccer) ==
Summary

Key:

- A.E.T – After extra time.
- P – Match decided by penalty-shootout.

Team	Event	Group Stage				Round of 16	Quarterfinal	Semifinal	Final / BM	
Team	Event	Opposition Score	Opposition Score	Opposition Score	Rank	Opposition Score	Opposition Score	Opposition Score	Opposition Score	Rank
Bangladesh men's	Men's tournament	Myanmar; L 0–1	India; L 0–1	China; D 0-0	4	Did not advance				20
Bangladesh women's	Women's tournament	Japan; L 0–8	Vietnam; L 1–6	Nepal; D 1-1	4	Did not advance				

== Kabaddi ==
Team	Event	Group stage					Semifinal	Final	
Team	Event	Opposition Score	Opposition Score	Opposition Score	Opposition Score	Rank	Opposition Score	Opposition Score	Rank
Bangladesh men's	Men's tournament	Japan; W 52–17	India; L 18–55	Chinese Taipei; L 18–31	Thailand; W 45–29	3	Did not advance		5
Bangladesh women's	Women's tournament	Nepal; L 24–37	Iran; L 16–54	—N/a	—N/a	3	Did not advance		6

== Swimming ==
Men

Athlete	Event	Heats		Semi-final		Final	
Athlete	Event	Time	Rank	Time	Rank	Time	Rank
Rafi Samiul Islam	50 m backstroke	27.20	22	did not advance			
Rafi Samiul Islam	100 m backstroke	1:00:02	21	did not advance			
