= Bangladesh at the 1998 Asian Games =

- IOC code: BAN
- NOC: Bangladesh Olympic Association

in Bangkok
- Medals Ranked 29th: Gold 0 Silver 0 Bronze 1 Total 1

Asian Games appearances (overview)
- 1978; 1982; 1986; 1990; 1994; 1998; 2002; 2006; 2010; 2014; 2018; 2022; 2026

Bangladesh participated in the 1998 Asian Games which were held from December 6 to December 20, 1998, in Bangkok, Thailand. Their only medal at the Games was a bronze in the Kabaddi event.

== Medalists ==
| Medal | Name | Sport | Event |
|---|---|---|---|
| Bronze | National team | Kabaddi | Men's Team |

== See also ==
- Bangladesh at the Asian Games
- Bangladesh at the Olympics
