= Jinnat Akter =

Bangladeshi wushu athlete

Personal information
- Born: 5 March 2003 (age 23)

Sport
- Sport: Wushu
- Weight class: 52 kg
- Event: Sanda
Medal record
Women's wushu (sanda)
Representing Bangladesh
Asian Games
Bronze medal – third place	2026 Aichi–Nagoya	52 kg

Jinnat Akter (born 5 March 2003) is a Bangladeshi wushu athlete who competes in the sanda discipline, primarily in the 52 kg category. She became the first Bangladeshi woman to win an individual medal at the Asian Games when she won a bronze medal in the 52 kg event at the 2026 Asian Games.

== Background ==
Akter had dreamed of playing football when she was young, which was opposed by her immediate family. After joined Ansar, she was persuaded to take up wushu after coaches realized her powerful kicks and strength. The Bangladesh Army then helped her transform her preparation.

== Career ==
At the 2026 Asian Games held in Nagoya, Akter competed in the women's 52 kg sanda. She advanced to the quarter-finals after her opponent Tharisa Dea Florentina of Indonesia was disqualified for not meeting the weight requirement, which assured her a medal. Akter then lost to Wu Di of China in the semi-finals, and was jointly awarded a bronze medal. As a result, she became the first Bangladeshi woman to win an individual medal at the Asian Games and the second athlete overall after boxer Mosharraf Hossain in 1986.
