= Shahanaz Parvin =

Bangladeshi cricketer (born 1991)

Personal information
- Full name: Shahanaz Parvin
- Born: 15 August 1991 (age 35); Bangladesh
- Batting: Right-handed
- Bowling: Right arm off break
- Role: Batter

International information
- National side: Bangladesh (2013)
- ODI debut (cap 18): 8 April 2013 v India
- Last ODI: 12 April 2013 v India
- T20I debut (cap 16): 2 April 2013 v India
- Last T20I: 4 April 2013 v India

Domestic team information
- Years: Team
- 2017: Rangpur Division
- 2017/18: Khulna Division

Career statistics
Competition	WODI	WT20I	WLA	WT20
Matches	2	2	3	7
Runs scored	2	28	4	86
Batting average	1.00	14.00	1.33	14.33
100s/50s	0/0	0/0	0/0	0/0
Top score	2	15	2	20
Balls bowled	–	–	24	6
Wickets	–	–	0	0
Bowling average	–	–	–	–
5 wickets in innings	–	–	–	–
10 wickets in match	–	–	–	–
Best bowling	–	–	–	–
Catches/stumpings	0/–	1/–	0/–	3/–
Medal record
Representing Bangladesh
Women's Cricket
Asian Games
Silver medal – second place	2014 Incheon	Team
- Source: CricketArchive, 11 April 2022

Shahanaz Parvin (Bengali: শাহনাজ পারভীন; born 15 August 1991) is a Bangladeshi former cricketer who played as a right-handed batter and a right-arm off break bowler. She appeared in two One Day Internationals and two Twenty20 Internationals for Bangladesh in April 2013, all against India. She played domestic cricket for Rangpur Division and Khulna Division.
