= Mabia Akhter =

Bangladeshi weightlifter (born 1999)

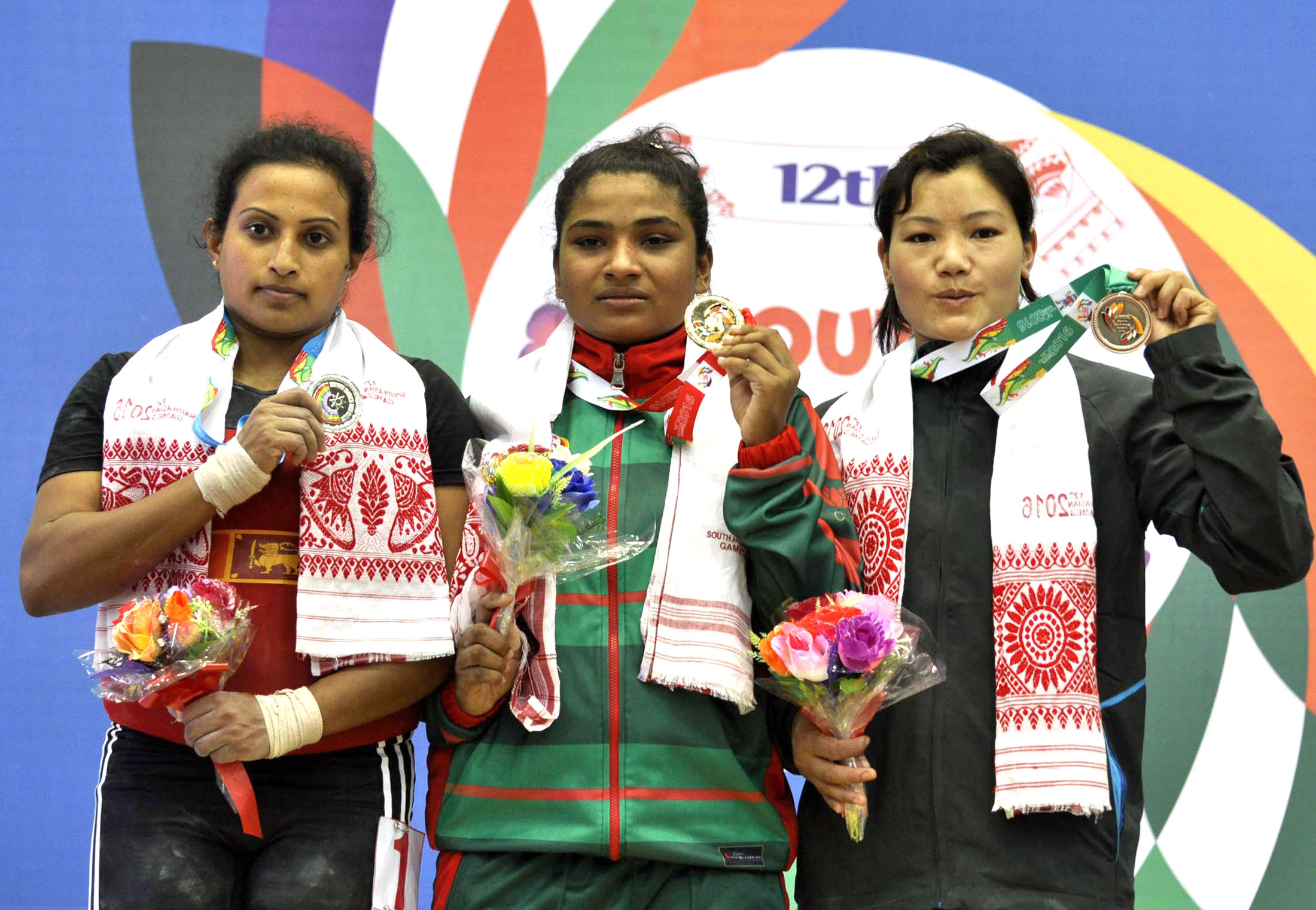
- 63kg women weight lifting Awards in 2016

Personal information
- Native name: মাবিয়া আকতার সীমান্ত
- Full name: Mabia Akhter Simanta
- Nickname: Simanta
- Nationality: Bangladeshi
- Born: Mabia Akhter; 7 October 1999 (age 26) Madaripur, Bangladesh

Sport
- Country: Bangladesh
- Sport: Weightlifting
- Event: 63 kg
Medal record
Women's weightlifting
Representing Bangladesh
South Asian Games
Gold medal – first place	Guwahati and Shillong 2016	63kg
Commonwealth Weightlifting Championship (Youth)
Gold medal – first place	Pune 2015	63kg
Commonwealth Weightlifting Championship (Senior)
Silver medal – second place	Pune 2015	63kg
Commonwealth Weightlifting Championship (Juniors)
Silver medal – second place	Pune 2015	63kg
- Updated on 8 February 2016

Mabia Akhter Simanta (born 7 October 1999) is a Bangladeshi weightlifter. She was born in Madaripur. She won gold medal in the women's 63 kg weight class at the 2016 South Asian Games at Guwahati. She also won a gold in youth section and two silver medals in senior & juniors section in the Commonwealth Weightlifting Championship in Pune, India in October 2015 in the women's 63 kg category. She lifted a total weight of 176 kg in winning the gold medal.

== Early life ==
Akhter's father Harunur Rashid was a small grocery owner.

== Career ==
She came into weightlifting by her maternal uncle, Shahadat Kazi in 2010. She won a bronze in the 2012 South Asian Weightlifting Championship, silver in the 2013 Commonwealth Weightlifting Championship in Malaysia.

In 2016, she took part in the Asian Weightlifting Championships for the first time and stood 13th in the women's 63 kg weight class. Mabia stood 6th in the same category during her 18th Asian Games journey.

Besides her sporting career, Mabia serves in Bangladesh Ansar.

== Personal life ==
Mabia Akhter came from a poor family. At one time her study was stopped due to poverty. Now she got admitted to Bangladesh Open University to continue her study.

== Awards ==
- Anannya Top Ten Awards (2015)

== See also ==
- Mahfuza Khatun, Bangladeshi swimmer
