= 2023–24 Pro Kabaddi League =

10th Season of Pro Kabaddi League

Pro Kabaddi League 2023-2024 Season 10

Tournament information
- Dates: 2 December 2023–1 March 2024
- Administrator: Mashal Sports
- Tournament format(s): Double round robin and playoffs
- Host: India
- Teams: 12
- Website: prokabaddi.com

Final positions
- Champion: Puneri Paltan (1st title)
- Runner-up: Haryana Steelers

Tournament statistics
- Matches played: 137
- Top scorer: (India) Ashu Malik (276) (Dabang Delhi)
- Most tackle points: (Iran) Mohammadreza Chiyaneh (99) (Puneri Paltan)
- Most successful raid: (India) Ashu Malik (Dabang Delhi) (228)
- Most successful tackle: (Iran) Mohammadreza Chiyaneh (97) (Puneri Paltan)

The 2023–2024 Pro Kabaddi League was the tenth season of the Pro Kabaddi League, a franchise based kabaddi league in India. Jaipur Pink Panthers were the defending champions.

In the final, Puneri Paltan defeated Haryana Steelers to win their maiden title.

== Background ==
The fixtures of the tournament were announced on 19 October 2023. The league returned to its original traveling caravan format returning after the 2019 season. Each team plays against all the other teams twice, and the top 6 teams proceed to the play-offs with the season beginning on 2 December 2023. All the playoff matches were played in Hyderabad and final was played on 1 March 2024.

== Participating teams ==
Locations of the Pro Kabaddi teams

The same 12 teams from the previous season returned with few changes to the team personnel.

Teams	Head coach	Captain	Kit Manufacturer
Bengal Warriors	(India) Kasinatha Baskaran	(India) Maninder Singh	
Bengaluru Bulls	(India) Randhir Singh Sehrawat	(India) Saurabh Nandal	Vats
Dabang Delhi	(India) Rambir Singh Khokha	(India) Naveen Kumar	Omtex
Gujarat Giants	(India) Ram Mehar Singh	(Iran) Fazel Atrachali	Shiv-Naresh
Haryana Steelers	(India) Manpreet Singh	(India) Jaideep Dahiya	Puma
Jaipur Pink Panthers	(India) Sanjeev Kumar Baliyan	(India) Sunil Kumar	TYKA Sports
Patna Pirates	(India) Narender Kumar Redhu	(India) Neeraj Kumar	Pace
Puneri Paltan	(India) BC Ramesh	(India) Aslam Inamdar	Shiv-Naresh
Tamil Thalaivas	(India) Ashan Kumar	(India) Sagar Rathee	Trak-Only
Telugu Titans	(India) Srinivasreddy Lingampally	(India) Pawan Sehrawat	Pace
U Mumba	(Iran) Gholamreza	(India) Surinder Singh	Nivia Sports
UP Yoddha	(India) Jasveer Singh	(India) Pardeep Narwal	Shiv-Naresh

== Personnel ==
The player auction happened on 9 and 10 October 2023 in Mumbai. The salary purse available to each franchise was increased from ₹4.4 crore (US$520,000) to ₹5 crore (US$590,000).

=== Foreign players ===
Each team can sign a maximum of three non-Indian players.

Team	Player 1	Player 2	Player 3
Bengal Warriors	(Chinese Taipei) Chai-Ming Chang	(Sri Lanka) Aslam Thambi	
Bengaluru Bulls	(Poland) Piotr Pamulak	(Bangladesh) Md. Liton Ali	
Dabang Delhi	(England) Felix Li	(England) Yuvraj Pandeya	
Gujarat Giants	(Iran) Fazel Atrachali	(Iran) Mohammad Esmaeil Nabibakhsh	
Haryana Steelers	(Nepal) Ghanshyam Magar	(Iraq) Hasan Balbool	
Jaipur Pink Panthers	(Iran) Amir Hossein Mohammadmaleki		
Patna Pirates	(Chinese Taipei) Zheng-Wei Chen	(Kenya) Daniel Odhiambo	
Puneri Paltan	(Iran) Mohammadreza Chiyaneh	(Iran) Vahid Reza Eimehr	
Tamil Thalaivas	(Iran) Amirhossein Bastami	(Iran) Mohammadreza Kaboudrahangi	
Telugu Titans	(Iran) Milad Jabbari	(Iran) Hamid Nader	
U Mumba	(Iran) Amirmohammad Zafardanesh	(Iran) Alireza Mirzaeian	
UP Yoddhas	(Kenya) Helvic Simuyu Wanjala	(Kenya) Samuel Wanjala Wafula	

== Sponsorship ==
Associate Sponsor

- Dream11
- Patanjali
- Roff
- UltraTech Cement

Broadcast Sponsor

- Star Sports

Digital Streaming Partner

- Disney+ Hotstar

== Venues ==
The league stage was scheduled in 12 cities.

Team	Location	Stadium	Capacity
Bengal Warriors	Kolkata, West Bengal	Netaji Indoor Stadium	12,000
Bengaluru Bulls	Bengaluru, Karnataka	Kanteerava Indoor Stadium	4,200
Dabang Delhi KC	Delhi	Thyagaraj Sports Complex	4,494
Gujarat Giants	Ahmedabad, Gujarat	The Arena	4,000
Haryana Steelers	Panchkula, Haryana	Tau Devilal Sports Complex	2,000
Jaipur Pink Panthers	Jaipur, Rajasthan	Sawai Mansingh Indoor Stadium	2,000
Patna Pirates	Patna, Bihar	Patliputra Sports Complex	3,500
Puneri Paltan	Pune, Maharashtra	Shree Shiv Chhatrapati Sports Complex	4,200
Tamil Thalaivas	Chennai, Tamil Nadu	Jawaharlal Nehru Indoor Stadium	5,000
Telugu Titans	Hyderabad, Telangana	Gachibowli Indoor Stadium	5,000
U Mumba	Mumbai, Maharashtra	Dome@NSCI SVP Stadium	5,000
UP Yoddha	Noida, Uttar Pradesh	Shaheed Vijay Singh Pathik Sports Complex	5,000

== Points table ==
Pos	Team	Pld	W	L	T	SD	Pts	
1	Puneri Paltan (C)	22	17	2	3	253	96	Qualification to semi finals
2	Jaipur Pink Panthers	22	16	3	3	141	92	Qualification to semi finals
3	Dabang Delhi	22	13	6	3	53	79	Qualification to eliminators
4	Gujarat Giants	22	13	9	0	32	70	Qualification to eliminators
5	Haryana Steelers (R)	22	13	8	1	-13	70	Qualification to eliminators
6	Patna Pirates	22	11	8	3	50	69	Qualification to eliminators
7	Bengal Warriors	22	9	11	2	-43	55	
8	Bengaluru Bulls	22	8	12	2	-67	53	
9	Tamil Thalaivas	22	9	13	0	32	51	
10	U Mumba	22	6	13	3	-79	45	
11	UP Yoddhas	22	4	17	1	-116	31	
12	Telugu Titans	22	2	19	1	-243	21	

Source: ProKabaddi
Rules for classification:
- 5 points for a win
- 3 points for a tied game
- 1 point for a loss by 7 points or fewer
(C) Champion; (R) Runners Up

== League Stage ==
=== Leg 1 – EKA Arena, Ahmedabad ===
Match 1
2 December 2023
20:00 (IST)

Gujarat Giants	38 – 32	Telugu Titans
Sonu Jaglan (11)	Report	Pawan Sehrawat (11)

Gujarat Giants Won

Match 2
2 December 2023
21:00 (IST)

U Mumba	34 – 31	UP Yoddhas
Amirmohammad Zafardanesh (12)	Report	Surender Gill (7)

U Mumba Won

Match 3
3 December 2023
20:00 (IST)

Tamil Thalaivas	42 – 31	Dabang Delhi
Ajinkya Pawar (21)	Report	Naveen Kumar (14)

Tamil Thalaivas Won

Match 4
3 December 2023
21:00 (IST)

Gujarat Giants	34 – 31	Bengaluru Bulls
Sonu Jaglan (12)	Report	Bharat Hooda (7)

Gujarat Giants Won

Match 5
4 December 2023
20:00 (IST)

Puneri Paltan	37 – 33	Jaipur Pink Panthers
Aslam Inamdar (10)	Report	Arjun Deshwal (17)

Puneri Paltan won

Match 6
4 December 2023
21:00 (IST)

Bengaluru Bulls	30 – 32	Bengal Warriors
Bharat Hooda (6)	Report	Maninder Singh (11)

Bengal Warriors won

Match 7
5 December 2023
20:00 (IST)

Gujarat Giants	39 – 37	U Mumba
Sonu Jaglan (11)	Report	Guman Singh (10)

Gujarat Giants won

Match 8
6 December 2023
20:00 (IST)

Telugu Titans	28 – 50	Patna Pirates
Pawan Sehrawat (11)	Report	Sachin Tanwar (14)

Patna Pirates won

Match 9
6 December 2023
21:00 (IST)

UP Yoddhas	57 – 27	Haryana Steelers
Surender Gill (13)	Report	Vinay (5)

UP Yoddhas won

Match 10
7 December 2023
20:00 (IST)

Bengal Warriors	28 – 28	Jaipur Pink Panthers
Shrikant Jadhav (7)	Report	Bhavani Rajput (10)

Match drawn

Match 11
7 December 2023
21:00 (IST)

Gujarat Giants	30 – 33	Patna Pirates
H.S. Rakesh (11)	Report	M. Sudhakar (6)

Patna Pirates won

=== Leg 2 – Kanteerava Indoor Stadium, Bangalore ===
Match 12
8 December 2023
20:00 (IST)

Bengaluru Bulls	31 – 38	Dabang Delhi
Bharat Hooda (12)	Report	Naveen Kumar (13)

Dabang Delhi won

Match 13
8 December 2023
21:00 (IST)

Puneri Paltan	43 – 32	U Mumba
Mohit Goyat (12)	Report	Visvanath V (6)

Puneri Paltan won

Match 14
9 December 2023
20:00 (IST)

Bengaluru Bulls	32 – 38	Haryana Steelers
Bharat Hooda (14)	Report	Vinay (8)

Haryana Steelers won

Match 15
9 December 2023
21:00 (IST)

UP Yoddhas	48 – 33	Telugu Titans
Surender Gill (14)	Report	Pawan Sehrawat (11)

UP Yoddhas won

Match 16
10 December 2023
20:00 (IST)

Bengal Warriors	48 – 38	Tamil Thalaivas
Maninder Singh (16)	Report	Narender (13)

Bengal Warriors won

Match 17
10 December 2023
21:00 (IST)

Dabang Delhi	33 – 35	Haryana Steelers
Naveen Kumar (16)	Report	Siddharth Desai (10)

Haryana Steelers won

Match 18
11 December 2023
20:00 (IST)

Jaipur Pink Panthers	35 – 32	Gujarat Giants
Arjun Deshwal (15)	Report	Sonu Jaglan (13)

Jaipur Pink Panthers won

Match 19
11 December 2023
21:00 (IST)

Bengaluru Bulls	38 – 36	UP Yoddhas
Vikash Khandola (11)	Report	Pardeep Narwal (13)

Bengaluru Bulls won

Match 20
12 December 2023
20:00 (IST)

Bengal Warriors	60 – 42	Patna Pirates
Maninder Singh (15)	Report	Sachin Tanwar (14); Sudhakar M(15)

Bengal Warriors won

Match 21
13 December 2023
20:00 (IST)

Tamil Thalaivas	38 – 36	Telugu Titans
Narender (10)	Report	Pawan Sehrawat (7)

Tamil Thalaivas won

Match 22
13 December 2023
21:00 (IST)

Bengaluru Bulls	32 – 30	Jaipur Pink Panthers
Bharat Hooda (9)	Report	V Ajith Kumar (9)

Bengaluru Bulls won

=== Leg 3 – Shree Shiv Chhatrapati Sports Complex, Pune ===
Match 23
15 December 2023
20:00 (IST)

U Mumba	42 – 40	Patna Pirates
Amirmohammad Zafardanesh (13)	Report	Sachin Tanwar (12)

U Mumba won

Match 24
15 December 2023
21:00 (IST)

Puneri Paltan	39 – 44	Haryana Steelers
Aslam Inamdar (8)	Report	Vinay (15)

Haryana Steelers won

Match 25
16 December 2023
20:00 (IST)

Puneri Paltan	49 – 19	Bengal Warriors
Mohit Goyat (10)	Report	Maninder Singh (7)

Puneri Paltan won

Match 26
16 December 2023
21:00 (IST)

Telugu Titans	40 – 51	Dabang Delhi
Pawan Sehrawat (14)	Report	Ashu Malik (15)

Dabang Delhi won

Match 27
17 December 2023
20:00 (IST)

Patna Pirates	28 – 29	Jaipur Pink Panthers
Sachin Tanwar (7)	Report	V. Ajith Kumar (15)

Jaipur Pink Panthers won

Match 28
17 December 2023
21:00 (IST)

U Mumba	46 – 33	Tamil Thalaivas
Guman Singh (11)	Report	Narender (10)

U Mumba won

Match 29
18 December 2023
20:00 (IST)

Bengal Warriors	37 – 37	UP Yoddhas
Nitin Kumar (10)	Report	Surender Gill (18)

Match drawn

Match 30
18 December 2023
21:00 (IST)

Puneri Paltan	30 – 23	Dabang Delhi
Mohit Goyat (7)	Report	Ashu Malik (9)

Puneri Paltan won

Match 31
19 December 2023
20:00 (IST)

Haryana Steelers	31 – 29	Gujarat Giants
Vinay (8)	Report	Rohit Gulia (7)

Haryana Steelers won

Match 32
20 December 2023
20:00 (IST)

Jaipur Pink Panthers	41 – 24	UP Yoddhas
Arjun Deshwal (12)	Report	Pardeep Narwal (6)

Jaipur Pink Panthers won

Match 33
20 December 2023
21:00 (IST)

Puneri Paltan	43 – 18	Bengaluru Bulls
Mohit Goyat (7)	Report	Vikash Khandola (4)

Puneri Paltan won

=== Leg 4 – Jawaharlal Nehru Indoor Stadium, Chennai ===
Match 34
22 December 2023
20:00 (IST)

Tamil Thalaivas	33 – 46	Patna Pirates
Himanshu (7)	Report	Sudhakar M (11)

Patna Pirates won

Match 35
22 December 2023
21:00 (IST)

Haryana Steelers	36 – 37	Telugu Titans
Shivam Patare (12)	Report	Pawan Sehrawat (10)

Telugu Titans won

Match 36
23 December 2023
20:00 (IST)

Tamil Thalaivas	24 – 25	Jaipur Pink Panthers
Himanshu (8)	Report	Arjun Deshwal (7)

Jaipur Pink Panthers won

Match 37
23 December 2023
21:00 (IST)

Gujarat Giants	38 – 30	UP Yoddhas
H. S. Rakesh (14)	Report	Surender Gill (13)

Gujarat Giants won

Match 38
24 December 2023
20:00 (IST)

U Mumba	39 – 37	Bengal Warriors
Amirmohammad Zafardanesh (8)	Report	Maninder Singh (11)

U Mumba won

Match 39
24 December 2023
21:00 (IST)

Bengaluru Bulls	33 – 31	Telugu Titans
Bharat Hooda (6)	Report	Pawan Sehrawat (13)

Bengaluru Bulls won

Match 40
25 December 2023
20:00 (IST)

Bengal Warriors	29 – 38	Dabang Delhi
Nitin Kumar (9)	Report	Naveen Kumar (11)

Dabang Delhi won

Match 41
25 December 2023
21:00 (IST)

Tamil Thalaivas	29 – 42	Haryana Steelers
Himanshu (8)	Report	Vinay (5)

Haryana Steelers won

Match 42
26 December 2023
20:00 (IST)

Puneri Paltan	46 – 28	Patna Pirates
Pankaj Mohite (10)	Report	Sachin Tanwar (6)

Puneri Paltan won

Match 43
27 December 2023
20:00 (IST)

Jaipur Pink Panthers	32 – 32	Dabang Delhi
Arjun Deshwal (12)	Report	Ashu Malik (7)

Match drawn

Match 44
27 December 2023
21:00 (IST)

Tamil Thalaivas	30 – 33	Gujarat Giants
Ajinkya Pawar (10)	Report	H.S. Rakesh (9)

Gujarat Giants won

=== Leg 5 – Noida Indoor Stadium, Noida ===
Match 45
29 December 2023
20:00 (IST)

Patna Pirates	46 – 33	Haryana Steelers
Manjeet (13)	Report	Vinay (12)

Patna Pirates won

Match 46
29 December 2023
21:00 (IST)

UP Yoddhas	34 – 33	Bengaluru Bulls
Pardeep Narwal (10)	Report	Sushil (8)

UP Yoddhas won

Match 47
30 December 2023
20:00 (IST)

Telugu Titans	34 – 52	U Mumba
Rajnish Dalal (8)	Report	Guman Singh (10)

U Mumba won

Match 48
30 December 2023
21:00 (IST)

UP Yoddhas	25 – 35	Dabang Delhi
Pardeep Narwal (7)	Report	Ashu Malik (11)

Dabang Delhi won

Match 49
31 December 2023
20:00 (IST)

Gujarat Giants	51 – 42	Bengal Warriors
Parteek Dahiya (25)	Report	Nitin Kumar (12)

Gujarat Giants won

Match 50
31 December 2023
21:00 (IST)

Tamil Thalaivas	37 – 38	Bengaluru Bulls
Narender (12)	Report	Bharat Hooda (9)

Bengaluru Bulls won

Match 51
1 January 2024
20:00 (IST)

Telugu Titans	18 - 54	Puneri Paltan
Sanjeevi S (3)	Report	Mohit Goyat (13)

Puneri Paltan won

Match 52
1 January 2024
21:00 (IST)

UP Yoddhas	41 – 48	Patna Pirates
Pardeep Narwal (21)	Report	Sachin Tanwar (13)

Patna Pirates won

Match 53
2 January 2024
20:00 (IST)

Gujarat Giants	28 – 35	Dabang Delhi
Parteek Dahiya (9)	Report	Ashu Malik (11)

Dabang Delhi won

Match 54
3 January 2024
20:00 (IST)

Haryana Steelers	34 – 45	Jaipur Pink Panthers
Chandran Ranjit (11)	Report	Arjun Deshwal (14)

Jaipur Pink Panthers won

Match 55
3 January 2024
21:00 (IST)

UP Yoddhas	31 – 40	Puneri Paltan
Pardeep Narwal (6)	Report	Aslam Inamdar (11)

Puneri Paltan won

=== Leg 6 – Dome@NSCI SVP Stadium, Mumbai ===
Match 56
5 January 2024
20:00 (IST)

Patna Pirates	37 – 38	Dabang Delhi
Sachin Tanwar (10)	Report	Ashu Malik (10)

Dabang Delhi won

Match 57
5 January 2024
21:00 (IST)

U Mumba	40 – 35	Bengaluru Bulls
Guman Singh (7)	Report	Sachin Narwal (6)

U Mumba won

Match 58
6 January 2024
20:00 (IST)

U Mumba	31 – 41	Jaipur Pink Panthers
Guman Singh (13)	Report	Arjun Deshwal (17)

Jaipur Pink Panthers won

Match 59
6 January 2024
21:00 (IST)

Telugu Titans	30 – 37	Gujarat Giants
Pawan Sehrawat (8)	Report	H.S. Rakesh (10)

Gujarat Giants won

Match 60
7 January 2024
20:00 (IST)

Puneri Paltan	29 – 26	Tamil Thalaivas
Aslam Inamdar (4)	Report	Narender (4)

Puneri Paltan won

Match 61
7 January 2024
21:00 (IST)

Bengal Warriors	35 – 41	Haryana Steelers
Shrikant Jadhav (10)	Report	Chandran Ranjit (8)

Haryana Steelers won

Match 62
8 January 2024
20:00 (IST)

Bengaluru Bulls	35 – 33	Patna Pirates
Sachin Narwal (8)	Report	Manjeet (7)

Bengaluru Bulls won

Match 63
8 January 2024
21:00 (IST)

U Mumba	34 – 40	Dabang Delhi
Amirmohammad Zafardanesh (9)	Report	Ashu Malik (13)

Dabang Delhi won

Match 64
9 January 2024
20:00 (IST)

Telugu Titans	26 – 46	Bengal Warriors
Pawan Sehrawat (11)	Report	Vaibhav Garje (9)

Bengal Warriors won

Match 65
10 January 2024
20:00 (IST)

UP Yoddhas	27 – 46	Tamil Thalaivas
Vijay Malik (10)	Report	Narender (14)

Tamil Thalaivas won

Match 66
10 January 2024
21:00 (IST)

U Mumba	44 – 44	Haryana Steelers
Amirmohammad Zafardanesh (11)	Report	Siddharth Sirish (7)

Match drawn

=== Leg 7 – Sawai Mansingh Indoor Stadium, Jaipur ===
Match 67
12 January 2024
20:00 (IST)

Jaipur Pink Panthers	38 – 35	Telugu Titans
Arjun Deshwal (14)	Report	Pawan Sehrawat (10)

Jaipur Pink Panthers won

Match 68
12 January 2024
21:00 (IST)

Puneri Paltan	37 – 17	Gujarat Giants
Aslam Inamdar (9)	Report	Parteek Dahiya (3)

Puneri Paltan won

Match 69
13 January 2024
20:00 (IST)

Jaipur Pink Panthers	36 – 34	Puneri Paltan
Arjun Deshwal (16)	Report	Aslam Inamdar (8)

Jaipur Pink Panthers won

Match 70
13 January 2024
21:00 (IST)

UP Yoddhas	37 – 42	Bengal Warriors
Pardeep Narwal (16)	Report	Maninder Singh (14)

Bengal Warriors won

Match 71
14 January 2024
20:00 (IST)

Haryana Steelers	36 – 31	Tamil Thalaivas
Vinay (10)	Report	Ajinkya Pawar (6)

Haryana Steelers won

Match 72
14 January 2024
21:00 (IST)

Dabang Delhi	39 – 39	Patna Pirates
Ashu Malik (14)	Report	Sachin Tanwar (10)

Match drawn

Match 73
15 January 2024
20:00 (IST)

Bengal Warriors	35 – 29	Bengaluru Bulls
Maninder Singh (9)	Report	Bharat Hooda (10)

Bengal Warriors won

Match 74
15 January 2024
21:00 (IST)

Jaipur Pink Panthers	31 – 29	U Mumba
Arjun Deshwal (11)	Report	Guman Singh (10)

Jaipur Pink Panthers won

Match 75
16 January 2024
20:00 (IST)

Patna Pirates	25 – 41	Tamil Thalaivas
Sudhakar M (8)	Report	Ajinkya Pawar (10)

Tamil Thalaivas won

Match 76
17 January 2024
20:00 (IST)

Dabang Delhi	26 – 31	Gujarat Giants
Ashu Malik (13)	Report	Sonu Jaglan (6)

Gujarat Giants won

Match 77
17 January 2024
21:00 (IST)

Jaipur Pink Panthers	37 – 27	Haryana Steelers
Arjun Deshwal (9)	Report	Shivam Patare (8)

Jaipur Pink Panthers won

=== Leg 8 – Gachibowli Indoor Stadium, Hyderabad ===
Match 78
19 January 2024
20:00 (IST)

Telugu Titans	26 – 42	Bengaluru Bulls
Pawan Sehrawat (7)	Report	Akshit Dhull (9)

Bengaluru Bulls won

Match 79
19 January 2024
21:00 (IST)

Patna Pirates	34 – 31	UP Yoddhas
Sachin Tanwar (6)	Report	Shivam Chaudhary (7)

Patna Pirates won

Match 80
20 January 2024
20:00 (IST)

Dabang Delhi	39 – 33	U Mumba
Ashu Malik (17)	Report	Guman Singh (13)

Dabang Delhi won

Match 81
20 January 2024
21:00 (IST)

Telugu Titans	49 – 32	UP Yoddhas
Pawan Sehrawat (15)	Report	Pardeep Narwal (10)

Telugu Titans won

Match 82
21 January 2024
20:00 (IST)

Bengaluru Bulls	28 – 45	Tamil Thalaivas
Akshit Dhull (12)	Report	Narender (13)

Tamil Thalaivas won

Match 83
21 January 2024
20:00 (IST)

Gujarat Giants	24 – 34	Puneri Paltan
Esmaeil Nabibakhsh (6)	Report	Mohit Goyat (6)

Puneri Paltan won

Match 84
22 January 2024
20:00 (IST)

Jaipur Pink Panthers	42 – 25	Bengal Warriors
Arjun Deshwal (15)	Report	Maninder Singh (9)

Jaipur Pink Panthers won

Match 85
22 January 2024
21:00 (IST)

Telugu Titans	30 – 37	Haryana Steelers
Sanjeevi S (6)	Report	Vinay (6)

Haryana Steelers won

Match 86
23 January 2024
20:00 (IST)

U Mumba	32 – 32	Puneri Paltan
Guman Singh (15)	Report	Aslam Inamdar (8)

Match drawn

Match 87
24 January 2024
20:00 (IST)

Haryana Steelers	32 – 35	Dabang Delhi
Siddharth Desai (11)	Report	Ashu Malik (14)

Dabang Delhi won

Match 88
24 January 2024
21:00 (IST)

Telugu Titans	29 – 54	Tamil Thalaivas
Pawan Sehrawat (10)	Report	Ajinkya Pawar (10)

Tamil Thalaivas won

=== Leg 9 – Patliputra Sports Complex, Patna ===
Match 89
26 January 2024
20:00 (IST)

Patna Pirates	44 – 28	Bengal Warriors
Manjeet (10)	Report	Nitin Kumar (10)

Patna Pirates won

Match 90
26 January 2024
21:00 (IST)

U Mumba	35 – 44	Gujarat Giants
Guman Singh (11)	Report	Parteek Dahiya (11)

Gujarat Giants won

Match 91
27 January 2024
20:00 (IST)

Patna Pirates	32 – 32	Puneri Paltan
Sachin Tanwar (8)	Report	Aslam Inamdar (12)

Match drawn

Match 92
27 January 2024
21:00 (IST)

Dabang Delhi	36 – 27	UP Yoddhas
Ashu Malik (11)	Report	Gagan Gowda (12)

Dabang Delhi won

Match 93
28 January 2024
20:00 (IST)

Jaipur Pink Panthers	28 – 28	Bengaluru Bulls
Arjun Deshwal (6)	Report	Akshit Dhull (5)

Match drawn

Match 94
28 January 2024
21:00 (IST)

Tamil Thalaivas	50 – 34	U Mumba
Narender (11)	Report	Guman Singh (12)

Tamil Thalaivas won

Match 95
29 January 2024
20:00 (IST)

Haryana Steelers	41 – 36	Bengal Warriors
Siddharth Desai (11)	Report	Maninder Singh (13)

Haryana Steelers won

Match 96
29 January 2024
21:00 (IST)

Patna Pirates	32 – 20	Gujarat Giants
Sandeep Kumar (7)	Report	Parteek Dahiya (6)

Patna Pirates won

Match 97
30 January 2024
20:00 (IST)

Puneri Paltan	60 – 29	Telugu Titans
Akash Shinde (11)	Report	Sanjeevi S (8)

Puneri Paltan won

Match 98
31 January 2024
20:00 (IST)

Patna Pirates	29 – 29	Bengaluru Bulls
Sandeep Kumar (14)	Report	Sushil (8)

Match drawn

Match 99
31 January 2024
21:00 (IST)

Jaipur Pink Panthers	42 – 27	Tamil Thalaivas
Arjun Deshwal (13)	Report	Narender (12)

Jaipur Pink Panthers won

=== Leg 10 – Thyagaraj Sports Complex, New Delhi ===
Match 100
2 February 2024
20:00 (IST)

Dabang Delhi	38 – 45	Bengal Warriors
Ashu Malik (17)	Report	Nitin Kumar (13)

Bengal Warriors won

Match 101
2 February 2024
21:00 (IST)

Gujarat Giants	30 – 34	Haryana Steelers
Parteek Dahiya (6)	Report	Vinay (9)

Haryana Steelers won

Match 102
3 February 2024
20:00 (IST)

UP Yoddhas	39 – 23	U Mumba
Gagan Gowda (6)	Report	Shivam (5)

UP Yoddhas won

Match 103
3 February 2024
21:00 (IST)

Dabang Delhi	44 – 33	Telugu Titans
Ashu Malik (20)	Report	Robin Chaudhary (8)

Dabang Delhi won

Match 104
4 February 2024
20:00 (IST)

Bengaluru Bulls	42 – 37	U Mumba
Sushil (10)	Report	Jai Bhagwan (9)

Bengaluru Bulls won

Match 105
4 February 2024
21:00 (IST)

Gujarat Giants	42 – 30	Tamil Thalaivas
H.S. Rakesh (14)	Report	Narender (8)

Gujarat Giants won

Match 106
5 February 2024
20:00 (IST)

Jaipur Pink Panthers	33 – 36	Patna Pirates
Arjun Deshwal (12)	Report	Sachin Tanwar (10)

Patna Pirates won

Match 107
5 February 2024
21:00 (IST)

Dabang Delhi	30 – 30	Puneri Paltan
Ashu Malik (8)	Report	Aslam Inamdar (10)

Match drawn

Match 108
6 February 2024
20:00 (IST)

Tamil Thalaivas	32 – 25	UP Yoddhas
Narender (10)	Report	Gagana Gowda (6)

Tamil Thalaivas won

Match 109
7 February 2024
20:00 (IST)

Bengaluru Bulls	31 – 40	Puneri Paltan
Sushil (9)	Report	Aslam Inamdar (11)

Puneri Paltan won

Match 110
7 February 2024
21:00 (IST)

Dabang Delhi	22 – 27	Jaipur Pink Panthers
Ashu Malik (9)	Report	Arjun Deshwal (10)

Jaipur Pink Panthers won

=== Leg 11 – Netaji Subhas Chandra Bose Indoor Stadium, Kolkata ===
Match 111
9 February 2024
20:00 (IST)

Bengal Warriors	32 – 41	Gujarat Giants
Nitin Kumar (12)	Report	Parteek Dahiya (12)

Gujarat Giants won

Match 112
9 February 2024
21:00 (IST)

Haryana Steelers	50 – 34	UP Yoddhas
Shivam Patare (12)	Report	Mahipal (11)

Haryana Steelers won

Match 113
10 February 2024
20:00 (IST)

Patna Pirates	44 – 23	U Mumba
Sachin Tanwar (9)	Report	Amirmohammad Zafardanesh (12)

Patna Pirates won

Match 114
10 February 2024
21:00 (IST)

Bengal Warriors	55 – 35	Telugu Titans
Nitin Kumar (13)	Report	Prafull Zaware (8)

Bengal Warriors won

Match 115
11 February 2024
20:00 (IST)

Tamil Thalaivas	29 – 56	Puneri Paltan
Himanshu Narwal (5)	Report	Pankaj Mohite (10)

Puneri Paltan won

Match 116
11 February 2024
21:00 (IST)

Bengaluru Bulls	28 – 50	Gujarat Giants
Rakshith (6)	Report	Parteek Dahiya (13)

Gujarat Giants won

Match 117
12 February 2024
20:00 (IST)

UP Yoddhas	30 – 67	Jaipur Pink Panthers
Gagan Gowda (10)	Report	Arjun Deshwal (20)

Jaipur Pink Panthers won

Match 118
12 February 2024
21:00 (IST)

Bengal Warriors	46 – 34	U Mumba
Maninder Singh (10)	Report	Shivam (11)

Bengal Warriors won

Match 119
13 February 2024
20:00 (IST)

Patna Pirates	38 – 36	Telugu Titans
Sandeep Kumar (7)	Report	Pawan Sehrawat (16)

Patna Pirates won

Match 120
14 February 2024
20:00 (IST)

Dabang Delhi	45 – 43	Tamil Thalaivas
Ashu Malik (18)	Report	Narender (18)

Dabang Delhi won

Match 121
14 February 2024
21:00 (IST)

Bengal Warriors	26 – 29	Puneri Paltan
Nitin Kumar (5)	Report	Akash Shinde (10)

Puneri Paltan won

=== Leg 12 – Tau Devilal Sports Complex, Panchkula ===
Match 122
16 February 2024
20:00 (IST)

Haryana Steelers	39 – 32	Patna Pirates
Siddharth Desai (12)	Report	Anuj Kumar (5)

Haryana Steelers won

Match 123
16 February 2024
21:00 (IST)

Telugu Titans	44 – 51	Jaipur Pink Panthers
Pawan Sehrawat (18)	Report	Arjun Deshwal (16)

Jaipur Pink Panthers won

Match 124
17 February 2024
20:00 (IST)

Haryana Steelers	46 – 40	U Mumba
Vishal Tate (15)	Report	Jai Bhagwan (8)

Haryana Steelers won

Match 125
17 February 2024
21:00 (IST)

UP Yoddhas	29 – 36	Gujarat Giants
Gagana Gowda (9)	Report	Parteek Dahiya (11)

Gujarat Giants won

Match 126
18 February 2024
20:00 (IST)

Tamil Thalaivas	74 – 37	Bengal Warriors
Vishal Chahal (18)	Report	Maninder Singh (9)

Tamil Thalaivas won

Match 127
18 February 2024
21:00 (IST)

Dabang Delhi	46 – 38	Bengaluru Bulls
Ashu Malik (17)	Report	Sushil (11)

Dabang Delhi won

Match 128
19 February 2024
20:00 (IST)

Gujarat Giants	36 – 45	Jaipur Pink Panthers
Parteek Dahiya (14)	Report	Arjun Deshwal (13)

Jaipur Pink Panthers won

Match 129
19 February 2024
21:00 (IST)

Haryana Steelers	36 – 51	Puneri Paltan
Vinay (8)	Report	Mohit Goyat (9)

Puneri Paltan won

Match 130
20 February 2024
20:00 (IST)

U Mumba	45 – 45	Telugu Titans
Amirmohammad Zafardanesh (11)	Report	Pawan Sehrawat (14)

Match drawn

Match 131
21 February 2024
20:00 (IST)

Puneri Paltan	40 – 38	UP Yoddhas
Pankaj Mohite (12)	Report	Gagana Gowda (16)

Puneri Paltan won

Match 132
21 February 2024
21:00 (IST)

Haryana Steelers	39 – 53	Bengaluru Bulls
Tejas Patil (11)	Report	Sushil (22)

Bengaluru Bulls won

== Playoffs ==
Eliminators
Eliminator 1
Dabang Delhi	35
Patna Pirates	37
Eliminator 2
Gujarat Giants	25
Haryana Steelers	42

Semi-finals
Semi-final 1
Puneri Paltan	37
Patna Pirates	21
Semi-final 2
Jaipur Pink Panthers	27
Haryana Steelers	31

Final
Puneri Paltan	28
Haryana Steelers	25

=== Eliminator 1 ===
Match 133
26 February 2024
20:00 (IST)

Dabang Delhi	35 – 37	Patna Pirates
Ashu Malik (19)	Report	Sachin Tanwar (9)

Patna Pirates won

=== Eliminator 2 ===
Match 134
26 February 2024
21:00 (IST)

Gujarat Giants	25 – 42	Haryana Steelers
Parteek Dahiya (5)	Report	Vinay (12)

Haryana Steelers won

=== Semi Final 1 ===
Match 135
28 February 2024
20:00 (IST)

Puneri Paltan	37 – 21	Patna Pirates
Aslam Inamdar (7)	Report	Sachin Tanwar (5)

Puneri Paltan won

=== Semi Final 2 ===
Match 136
28 February 2024
21:00 (IST)

Jaipur Pink Panthers	27 – 31	Haryana Steelers
Arjun Deshwal (14)	Report	Vinay (11)

Haryana Steelers won

=== Final ===
Match 137
1 March 2024
20:00 (IST)

Puneri Paltan	28 – 25	Haryana Steelers
Pankaj Mohite (9)	Report	Shivam Patare (6)

Puneri Paltan won

== Broadcasting ==
The matches were broadcast by Star Sports in India. It was also streamed live by Disney+ Hotstar.

== Statistics ==
=== Most raid points ===
#	Player	Team	Matches	Raid Points
1	(India) Ashu Malik	Dabang Delhi	23	276
2	(India) Arjun Deshwal	Jaipur Pink Panthers	23	276
3	(India) Pawan Sehrawat	Telugu Titans	21	202
4	(India) Maninder Singh	Bengal Warriors	21	197
5	(India) Narendar	Tamil Thalaivas	21	186
As of 1 March 2024

=== Most tackle points ===
#	Player	Team	Matches	Tackle Points
1	(Iran) Mohammadreza Chiyaneh	Puneri Paltan	24	99
2	(India) Krishan	Patna Pirates	24	78
3	(India) Yogesh	Dabang Delhi	23	74
4	(India) Rahul Sethpal	Haryana Steelers	23	73
5	(India) Ankush	Jaipur Pink Panthers	22	70
As of 1 March 2024
