= 2025 Pro Kabaddi League =

12th Season of Pro Kabaddi League

2025 Pro Kabaddi League Season 12
Tournament information
- Dates: 29 August 2025–31 October 2025
- Administrator: Mashal Sports
- Tournament format(s): Double round robin and playoffs
- Host: India
- Teams: 12
- Broadcast: Star Sports Network; JioHotstar
- Website: Pro Kabaddi

Final positions
- Champion: Dabang Delhi K.C. (2nd title)
- Runner-up: Puneri Paltan

Tournament statistics
- Matches played: 117
- Top scorer: (India) Ayan Lohchab (324) (Patna Pirates)
- Most valuable player: (Iran) Fazel Atrachali (Dabang Delhi K.C.)
- Most raid points: (India) Ayan Lohchab (316) (Patna Pirates)
- Most tackle points: (India) Navdeep Singh (73) (Patna Pirates)

The 2025 Pro Kabaddi League is the 12th edition of the Pro Kabaddi League, a franchise-based Kabaddi league in India, organised by Mashal Sports since 2014. The season began on 29 August 2025.

Haryana Steelers are the defending champions, winning their maiden title in the previous edition.

In the final of PKL 12, Dabang Delhi K.C. won the second title by defeating Puneri Paltan.

== Participating teams ==
Locations of the Pro Kabaddi teams

The same 12 teams from the previous season returned to compete in the 2025 Pro Kabaddi League.

Teams	Head coach	Captain
Bengal Warriorz	Naveen Kumar	Devank Dalal
Bengaluru Bulls	BC Ramesh	Yogesh Dahiya
Dabang Delhi K.C.	Joginder Narwal	Ashu Malik
Gujarat Giants	Jaivir Sharma	Md Reza Shadloui
Haryana Steelers	Manpreet Singh	Jaideep Dahiya
Jaipur Pink Panthers	Narender Redhu	Reza Mirbagheri
Patna Pirates	Randeep Dalal	Ankit Jaglan
Puneri Paltan	Ajay Thakur	Aslam Inamdar
Tamil Thalaivas	Sanjeev Baliyan	Arjun Deshwal
Telugu Titans	Krishan Kumar Hooda	Vijay Malik
U Mumba	Anil Chaprana	Sunil Kumar
UP Yoddha	Jasvir Singh	Sumit Sangwan

== Format ==
The format for the season consisted of a league stage followed by playoffs. The league stage consisted of 108 matches, with each team playing 18 matches.

Teams are awarded two points for a win and none for a loss. A tie-breaker rule was introduced to all league-stage matches in case the teams finish with the same number of points at the end of regular time. The tie-breaker consisted of a five raid shootout with specific conditions. The teams would have seven players at all time with no outs or revivals, and the baulk line would become the bonus line. Each team nominated five different raiders to raid in the specified order with raids alternating between teams. If the points were still tied after five raids, the winner would be decided by a golden raid. In case both teams remain tied after golden raids, the winner would be decided by a coin toss.

The playoff system was also revamped compared to the previous seasons to include more matches and additional teams. As per the new playoff rules, the top eight teams qualified for the knockout stages. The playoffs consisted of nine matches.

- The teams finishing from 5th to 8th competed in two play-in matches with the winners advancing to the first eliminator.
- The sides in 3rd and 4th position compete in a Mini-qualifier with the winner qualifying to the Eliminator 3, and the loser facing off against the winner of Eliminator 1 in Eliminator 2.
- The winners of Eliminators 2 and 3 compete to determine the team that advances to Qualifier 2
- The top two sides compete in Qualifier 1 with the winner advancing to the final
- The winner of the Eliminator 3 and the loser of Qualifier 1 face-off in Qualifier 2 to determine the second finalist

== Venues ==
The league stage was played across four venues.

Venue	Location	Capacity	Dates
Rajiv Gandhi Indoor Stadium	Visakhapatnam, Andhra Pradesh	10,000	29 August–11 September
Sawai Mansingh Indoor Stadium	Jaipur, Rajasthan	2,000	12 September–27 September
SDAT Multi purpose Indoor Stadium	Chennai, Tamil Nadu	5,000	29 September–12 October
Thyagaraj Indoor Stadium	New Delhi, Delhi	4,500	13 October–31 October

== Points table ==
Pos	Team	Pld	W	L	SD	Pts	
1	Puneri Paltan (R)	18	13	5	88	26	Qualified for Qualifiers
2	Dabang Delhi K.C. (C)	18	13	5	38	26	Qualified for Qualifiers
3	Bengaluru Bulls	18	11	7	97	22	Qualified for Mini-qualifier
4	Telugu Titans	18	10	8	45	20	Qualified for Mini-qualifier
5	Haryana Steelers	18	10	8	40	20	Qualified for Play-ins
6	U Mumba	18	10	8	8	20	Qualified for Play-ins
7	Patna Pirates	18	8	10	12	16	Qualified for Play-ins
8	Jaipur Pink Panthers	18	8	10	-48	16	Qualified for Play-ins
9	UP Yoddhas	18	7	11	-65	14	
10	Tamil Thalaivas	18	6	12	-36	12	
11	Gujarat Giants	18	6	12	-73	12	
12	Bengal Warriorz	18	6	12	-106	12	

Source: ProKabaddi
Rules for classification:
- 2 points for a win
- 0 point for a loss
(C) Champion; (R) Runners up

== League stage ==
=== Performance summary ===
Team ╲ Round	1	2	3	4	5	6	7	8	9	10	11	12	13	14	15	16	17	18
Bengal Warriorz	W	L	L	L	L	W	L	W	L	L	W	L	L	W	L	L	W	L
Bengaluru Bulls	L	L	L	W	W	W	W	L	W	L	L	W	W	W	L	W	W	W
Dabang Delhi	W	W	W	W	W	W	L	W	W	W	W	W	L	W	L	W	L	L
Gujarat Giants	L	L	W	L	L	L	L	L	W	L	W	W	L	L	W	L	L	L
Haryana Steelers	L	W	W	L	W	W	W	W	L	L	L	L	L	W	W	L	W	W
Jaipur Pink Panthers	W	L	L	W	L	W	W	W	L	W	L	L	L	L	W	W	L	L
Patna Pirates	L	L	L	W	L	L	W	L	L	W	L	L	L	W	W	W	W	W
Puneri Paltan	W	W	W	L	L	W	W	W	L	W	W	W	W	W	W	W	L	L
Tamil Thalaivas	W	L	L	W	W	L	L	L	W	L	W	L	W	L	L	L	L	L
Telugu Titans	L	L	W	W	W	L	L	L	W	W	W	W	W	L	L	W	W	L
U Mumba	W	W	L	W	L	W	L	L	L	W	W	L	W	L	W	W	W	L
UP Yoddhas	W	W	L	L	L	L	W	W	L	L	L	L	L	W	W	L	L	W

Source: Results
W = Win; L = Lose

=== Leg 1 — Visakhapatnam ===
All times are in Indian Standard Time (UTC+5.30). R indicated raid points, while T indicated tackle points.

Match 1
29 August 2025
20:00

Telugu Titans	35 – 38	Tamil Thalaivas
Bharat Hooda (9R); Shubham Shinde (4T)	Scorecard	Arjun Deshwal (12R); Himanshu (3T); Suresh Jadhav (3T)

Tamil Thalaivas won by 3 points

- Tamil Thalaivas won the toss and elected to defend first.

Match 2
29 August 2025
21:00

Bengaluru Bulls	32 – 32 4 – 6	Puneri Paltan
Akash Shinde (12R); Ankush Rathee (5T)	Scorecard	Aditya Shinde (9R); Gaurav Khatri (5T)

Puneri Paltan won by tie-breaker

- Puneri Paltan won the toss and elected to raid first.

Match 3
30 August 2025
20:00

Telugu Titans	35 – 40	UP Yoddhas
Vijay Malik (14R); Ajit Pawar (2T); Ankit (2T)	Scorecard	Gagan Gowda (14R); Sumit Sangwan (8T)

UP Yoddhas won by 5 points

- UP Yoddhas won the toss and elected to defend first.

Match 4
30 August 2025
21:00

U Mumba	29 – 29 6 – 5	Gujarat Giants
Rohit Raghav (5R) (2T); Lokesh Ghosliya (2T)	Scorecard	Himanshu Singh (6R); Mohammad Reza Shadloui (3T); Himanshu (3T)

U Mumba won by tie-breaker

- U Mumba won the toss and elected to defend first.

Match 5
31 August 2025
20:00

Tamil Thalaivas	33 – 36	U Mumba
Arjun Deshwal (12R); Nitesh Kumar (4T); Himanshu (4T)	Scorecard	Ajit Chavan (9R); Lokesh Ghosliya (4T); Rinku Sharma (4T)

U Mumba won by 3 points

- Tamil Thalaivas won the toss and elected to defend first.

Match 6
31 August 2025
21:00

Bengal Warriors	54 – 44	Haryana Steelers
Devank Dalal (21R); Ashish Malik (5T)	Scorecard	Shivam Patare (17R); Rahul Sethpal (3T); Neeraj Kumar (3T)

Bengal Warriors won by 10 points

- Bengal Warriors won the toss and elected to defend first.

Match 7
01 September 2025
20:00

Patna Pirates	31 – 34	UP Yoddhas
Ayan Lohchab (9R); Ankit Jaglan (3T); Deepak (3T)	Scorecard	Gagan Gowda (7R); Sumit Sangwan (5T); Ashu Singh (5T)

UP Yoddhas won by 3 points

- UP Yoddhas won the toss and elected to defend first.

Match 8
01 September 2025
21:00

Puneri Paltan	41 – 19	Gujarat Giants
Aditya Shinde (6R); Abinesh Nadarajan (6T)	Scorecard	Rakesh Sungroya (6R); Shubham Kumar (3T)

Puneri Paltan won by 22 points

- Gujarat Giants won the toss and elected to defend first.

Match 9
02 September 2025
20:00

Dabang Delhi K.C.	41 – 34	Bengaluru Bulls
Ashu Malik (15R); Surjeet Singh (3T); Fazel Atrachali (3T); Saurabh Nandal (3T)	Scorecard	Alireza Mirzaian (10R); Yogesh Dahiya (2T); Manish (2T)

Dabang Delhi K.C. won by 7 points

- Dabang Delhi K.C. won the toss and elected to defend first.

Match 10
02 September 2025
21:00

Jaipur Pink Panthers	39 – 36	Patna Pirates
Nitin Kumar (13R); Reza Mirbagheri (3T)	Scorecard	Maninder Singh (15R); Ashish Birwal (2T); Sanket Sawant (2T); Navdeep (2T)

Jaipur Pink Panthers won by 3 points

- Jaipur Pink Panthers won the toss and elected to defend first.

Match 11
03 September 2025
20:00

Puneri Paltan	45 – 36	Bengal Warriorz
Aditya Shinde (11R); Vishal Bhardwaj (5T); Gurdeep Sangwan (5T)	Scorecard	Devank Dalal (17R); Manjeet Choudary (2T)

Puneri Paltan won by 9 points

- Puneri Paltan won the toss and elected to raid first.

Match 12
03 September 2025
21:00

Haryana Steelers	36 – 36 7 – 6	U Mumba
Naveen Kumar(9R); Rahul Sethpal(2T); Jaideep Dahiya(2T); Neeraj Kumar(2T)	Scorecard	Ajit Chavan(12R); Sunil Kumar(3T); Lokesh Ghosliya(3T); Rohit Raghav(3T)

Haryana Steelers won by tie-breaker

- Haryana Steelers won the toss and elected to defend first.

Match 13
04 September 2025
20:00

Jaipur Pink Panthers	32 – 37	Telugu Titans
Nitin Kumar(13R); Reza Mirbagheri(3T); Nitin Rawal(3T)	Scorecard	Vijay Malik (8R); Ajit Pawar (5T)

Telugu Titans won by 5 points

Match 14
04 September 2025
21:00

Puneri Paltan	28 – 28 5 – 5 0 - 2	Dabang Delhi K.C.
Aditya Shinde(6R); Gaurav Khatri(5T)	Scorecard	Ashu Malik (10R); Fazel Atrachali (5T)

Dabang Delhi K.C. won by golden raid

Match 15
05 September 2025
20:00

U Mumba	48 – 28	Bengaluru Bulls
Ajit Chavan(13R); Rinku Sharma(5T)	Scorecard	Alireza Mirzaian (6R); Ashish Malik (6R); Deepak Sankar (3T)

U Mumba won by 20 points

Match 16
05 September 2025
21:00

Haryana Steelers	37 – 32	UP Yoddhas
Naveen Kumar(6R); Rahul Kalirawna(6T)	Scorecard	Gagan Gowda (13R); Hitesh(4T)

Haryana Steelers won by 5 points

Match 17
06 September 2025
20:00

Patna Pirates	30 – 38	Bengaluru Bulls
Ayan Lohchab (10R); Deepak Rathee (3T)	Scorecard	Alireza Mirzaian (10R); Deepak Sankar (4T)

Bengaluru Bulls won by 8 points

Match 18
06 September 2025
21:00

Tamil Thalaivas	28 – 37	Gujarat Giants
Pawan Sehrawat (6R); Nitesh Kumar (5T)	Scorecard	Rakesh Sungroya (6R); Nitin Panwar (8T)

Gujarat Giants won by 9 points

Match 19
07 September 2025
20:00

Bengal Warriorz	34 – 44	Telugu Titans
Devank Dalal (13R); Nitesh Kumar(6T)	Scorecard	Bharat Hooda (11R); Ankit (5T)

Telugu Titans won by 10 points

Match 20
07 September 2025
21:00

Dabang Delhi K.C.	36 – 35	Jaipur Pink Panthers
Ashu Malik (20R); Saurabh Nandal(3T)	Scorecard	Nitin Kumar (14R); Nitin Rawal (2T)

Dabang Delhi K.C. won by 1 point

Match 21
08 September 2025
20:00

Haryana Steelers	33 – 40	Bengaluru Bulls
Shivam Patare (7R); Jaideep Dahiya(3T); Rahul Kalirawna(3T)	Scorecard	Alireza Mirzaian (12R); Yogesh Dahiya (6T)

Bengaluru Bulls won by 7 points

Match 22
08 September 2025
21:00

Puneri Paltan	37 – 48	Patna Pirates
Sachin Tanwar (6R); Rakesh Rajesh (2T)	Scorecard	Ayan Lohchab (21R); Ankit Jaglan (3T); Deepak Rathee (3T); Navdeep (3T)

Patna Pirates won by 11 points

Match 23
09 September 2025
20:00

Dabang Delhi K.C.	45 – 34	Bengal Warriorz
Ashu Malik (16R); Surjeet Singh (3T)	Scorecard	Devank Dalal (12R); Parteek (2T)

Dabang Delhi K.C. won by 11 points

Match 24
09 September 2025
21:00

Gujarat Giants	30 – 30 5 – 5 0 - 1	Jaipur Pink Panthers
Rakesh Sungroya (11R); Nitin Panwar (4T)	Scorecard	Nitin Kumar (15R); Deepanshu Khatri (3T)

Jaipur Pink Panthers won by golden raid

Match 25
10 September 2025
20:00

U Mumba	37 – 45	Telugu Titans
Sandeep Kumar (7R); Amirmohammad Zafardanesh (7R); Sunil Kumar (6T)	Scorecard	Bharat Hooda (12R); Chetan Sahu (4T)

Telugu Titans won by 8 points

Match 26
10 September 2025
21:00

UP Yoddhas	32 – 43	Puneri Paltan
Gagan Gowda (12R); Hitesh (2T); Mahender Singh (2T)	Scorecard	Aditya Shinde (12R); Gaurav Khatri (5T)

Puneri Paltan won by 11 points

Match 27
11 September 2025
20:00

U Mumba	40 – 39	Patna Pirates
Amirmohammad Zafardanesh (12R); Vijay Kumar (4T)	Scorecard	Ayan Lohchab (21R); Ankit Jaglan (3T)

U Mumba won by 1 point

Match 28
11 September 2025
21:00

Dabang Delhi K.C.	38 – 28	Gujarat Giants
Ashu Malik (14R); Fazel Atrachali (5T)	Scorecard	Prateek Dahiya (9R); Himanshu (2T); Mohammad Reza Shadloui (2T)

Dabang Delhi K.C. won by 10 points

=== Leg 2 — Jaipur ===
Match 29
12 September 2025
20:00

Jaipur Pink Panthers	23 – 28	Bengaluru Bulls
Nitin Kumar (8R); Aryan Kumar (2T)	Scorecard	Alireza Mirzaian (8R); Deepak Sankar (5T)

Bengaluru Bulls won by 5 points

Match 30
12 September 2025
21:00

Tamil Thalaivas	46 – 36	Bengal Warriorz
Arjun Deshwal (17R); Ronak (4T)	Scorecard	Devank Dalal (13R); Ankit (3T)

Tamil Thalaivas won by 10 points

Match 31
13 September 2025
20:00

UP Yoddhas	29 – 41	Jaipur Pink Panthers
Gagan Gowda (16R); Sumit Sangwan (4T)	Scorecard	Nitin Kumar (11R); Reza Mirbagheri (4T)

Jaipur Pink Panthers won by 12 points

Match 32
13 September 2025
21:00

Puneri Paltan	39 – 33	Telugu Titans
Aslam Inamdar (5R); Pankaj Mohite (5R); Aditya Shinde(5R); Gaurav Khatri (7T)	Scorecard	Bharat Hooda (11R); Avi Duhan (4T)

Puneri Paltan won by 6 points

Match 33
15 September 2025
20:00

Gujarat Giants	37 – 40	Haryana Steelers
Rakesh Sungroya (14R); Nitin Panwar (3T)	Scorecard	Shivam Patare (10R); Jaideep Dahiya (5T)

Haryana Steelers won 3 points

Match 34
15 September 2025
21:00

Bengaluru Bulls	34 – 32	Telugu Titans
Alireza Mirzaian (11R); Yogesh Dahiya (3T)	Scorecard	Bharat Hooda (13R); Shubham Shinde (2T); Ankit (2T)

Bengaluru Bulls won 2 points

Match 35
16 September 2025
20:00

UP Yoddhas	37 – 41	Bengal Warriorz
Shivam Chaudhary (7R); Gagan Gowda(7R); Ashu Singh(4T); Hitesh(4T)	Scorecard	Devank Dalal (17R); Ashish Malik (6T)

Bengal Warriorz won by 4 points

Match 36
16 September 2025
21:00

Tamil Thalaivas	35 – 29	Bengaluru Bulls
Arjun Deshwal (13R); Ronak (4T)	Scorecard	Alireza Mirzaian (10R); Yogesh Dahiya (3T)

Tamil Thalaivas won by 6 points

Match 37
17 September 2025
20:00

Telugu Titans	29 – 33	Dabang Delhi K.C.
Vijay Malik (5R); Ajit Pawar (4T)	Scorecard	Neeraj Narwal (8R); Saurabh Nadal (5T); Fazel Atrachali (5T)

Dabang Delhi K.C. won by 4 points

Match 38
17 September 2025
21:00

Haryana Steelers	43 – 32	Patna Pirates
Shivam Patare (13R); Hardeep Ranbir (5T); Jaideep Dahiya (5T)	Scorecard	Ayan Lohchab (6R); Navdeep (4T)

Haryana Steelers won by 11 points

Match 39
18 September 2025
20:00

Jaipur Pink Panthers	45 – 41	Bengal Warriorz
Nitin Kumar (13R); Ashish Bambal (4T)	Scorecard	Devank Dalal (16R); Ashish Malik (6T)

Jaipur Pink Panthers won by 4 points

Match 40
18 September 2025
21:00

U Mumba	22 – 40	Puneri Paltan
Amirmohammad Zafardanesh (5R); Rinku Sharma (4T)	Scorecard	Stuwart Singh (8R); Gurdeep (5T)

Puneri Paltan won by 18 points

Match 41
19 September 2025
20:00

Puneri Paltan	30 – 34	Haryana Steelers
Pankaj Mohite (14R); Vishal Bhardwaj (3T)	Scorecard	Vinay (13R); Jaideep Dahiya (4T)

Haryana Steelers won by 4 points

Match 42
19 September 2025
21:00

Tamil Thalaivas	29 – 43	Telugu Titans
Arjun Deshwal (7R); Narender(2T); Ronak(2T)	Scorecard	Vijay Malik (10R); Ankit (4T)

Telugu Titans won by 14 points

Match 43
20 September 2025
20:00

Patna Pirates	33 – 30	Dabang Delhi K.C.
Ankit Rana (12R); Ankit Jaglan (6T)	Scorecard	Neeraj Narwal (8R); Saurabh Nandal (3T)

Patna Pirates won by 3 points

Match 44
20 September 2025
21:00

Haryana Steelers	38 – 36	Tamil Thalaivas
Shivam Patare (9R); Jaideep Dahiya (3T); Sahil (3T)	Scorecard	Arjun Deshwal (13R); Himanshu (4T)

Haryana Steelers won by 2 points

Match 45
22 September 2025
20:00

Gujarat Giants	24 – 28	Bengaluru Bulls
Vishwanath V (5R); Lucky Sharma (4T)	Scorecard	Akash Shinde (6R); Yogesh Dahiya (4T)

Bengaluru Bulls won by 4 points

Match 46
22 September 2025
21:00

Tamil Thalaivas	22 – 39	UP Yoddhas
Moein Shafagi (3R); Nitesh Kumar (7T)	Scorecard	Gagan Gowda (7R); Sumit (5T)

UP Yoddhas won by 17 points

Match 47
23 September 2025
20:00

Gujarat Giants	29 – 30	Telugu Titans
Mohammad Reza Shadloui (6R); Rohit Nandal (2T)	Scorecard	Bharat (8R); Shubham Shinde (4T)

Telugu Titans won by 1 point

Match 48
23 September 2025
21:00

Jaipur Pink Panthers	38 – 38 6 – 4	U Mumba
Nitin Kumar (14R); Reza Mirbagheri (3T)	Scorecard	Sandeep Kumar (14R); Lokesh Ghoslita (4T

Jaipur Pink Panthers won by tie-breaker

Match 49
25 September 2025
20:00

Bengaluru Bulls	36 – 36 5 – 6	UP Yoddhas
Alireza Mirzaian (10R); Deepak Sankar (3T)	Scorecard	Bhavani Rajput (10R); Ashu Singh (4T)<>Sumit Sangwan (4T)

UP Yoddhas won by tie-breaker

Match 50
25 September 2025
21:00

Dabang Delhi K.C.	47 – 26	U Mumba
Ashu Malik (23R); Fazel Atrachali (4T)	Scorecard	Sandeep Kumar (11R); Sunil Kumar (3T)

Dabang Delhi K.C. won by 21 points

Match 51
27 September 2025
20:00

Patna Pirates	42 – 48	Bengal Warriorz
Ayan Lohchab (15R); Ankith Jaglan (4T)	Scorecard	Devank (22R); Ashish Malik (5T)

Bengal Warriorz won by 6 points

Match 52
27 September 2025
21:00

Jaipur Pink Panthers	28 – 37	Tamil Thalaivas
Nitin Kumar (8R); Aryan Kumar (2T)	Scorecard	Arjun Deshwal (13R); Nitesh Kumar (6T)

Tamil Thalaivas won by 9 points

=== Leg 3 — Chennai ===
Match 53
29 September 2025
20:00

UP Yoddhas	27 – 33	Gujarat Giants
Bhavani Rajput (8R); Sumit (4T)	Scorecard	Rakesh Sungroya (6R); Ankith Dahiya (7T)

Gujrat Giants won by 6 points

Match 54
29 September 2025
21:00

Dabang Delhi K.C.	38 – 37	Haryana Steelers
Ashu Malik (15R); Surjeet Singh (3T)	Scorecard	Vinay (18R); Jaideep Dahiya (5T)

Dabang Delhi K.C won by 1 point

Match 55
30 September 2025
20:00

Telugu Titans	37 – 28	Patna Pirates
Vijay Malik (12R); Ankith (4T)	Scorecard	Ayan Lohchab (13R); Deepak Rathee (1T)

Telugu Titans won by 9 points

Match 56
30 September 2025
21:00

Bengal Warriorz	44 – 49	Puneri Paltan
Devank (25R); Ashish Malik (3T)	Scorecard	Aditya Shinde (18R); Abhinesh Nadarajan (3T)

Puneri Paltan won by 5 points

Match 57
1 October 2025
20:00

Haryana Steelers	36 – 37	Jaipur Pink Panthers
Vinay (11R); Rahul Sethpal (5T)	Scorecard	Sahil Satpal (7R); Deepanshu Khatri (4T)

Jaipur Pink Panthers won by 1 point

Match 58
1 October 2025
21:00

U Mumba	42 – 24	Tamil Thalaivas
Sandeep Kumar (12R); Sunil Kumar (6T)	Scorecard	Rohit Gopal Lal Beniwal (7R); Nitesh Kumar (5T)

U Mumba won by 12 points

Match 59
2 October 2025
20:00

Puneri Paltan	29 – 29	Bengaluru Bulls
	Scorecard

Puneri Paltan won by tie-breaker

Match 60
2 October 2025
21:00

Gujarat Giants	25 – 40	U Mumba
	Scorecard

U Mumba won by 15 points

Match 61
3 October 2025
20:00

Dabang Delhi K.C.	43 – 26	UP Yoddhas
	Scorecard

Dabang Delhi K.C. won by 17 points

Match 62
3 October 2025
21:00

Tamil Thalaivas	45 – 33	Haryana Steelers
	Scorecard

Tamil Thalaivas won by 12 points

Match 63
4 October 2025
20:00

Puneri Paltan	41 – 36	Jaipur Pink Panthers
	Scorecard

Puneri Paltan won by 5 points

Match 64
4 October 2025
21:00

Gujarat Giants	47 – 40	Bengal Warriorz
	Scorecard

Gujarat Giants won by 7 points

Match 65
5 October 2025
20:00

UP Yoddhas	35 – 40	Telugu Titans
	Scorecard

Telugu Titans won by 5 points

Match 66
5 October 2025
21:00

Bengaluru Bulls	33 – 29	Tamil Thalaivas
	Scorecard

Bengaluru Bulls won by 4 points

Match 67
6 October 2025
20:00

Jaipur Pink Panthers	26 – 29	Dabang Delhi K.C.
	Scorecard

Dabang Delhi K.C. won by 3 points

Match 68
6 October 2025
21:00

UP Yoddhas	28 – 36	Patna Pirates
	Scorecard

Patna Pirates won by 8 points

Match 69
7 October 2025
20:00

Patna Pirates	37 – 56	Tamil Thalaivas
	Scorecard

Tamil Thalaivas won by 19 points

Match 70
7 October 2025
21:00

Haryana Steelers	33 – 33 3 - 9	Dabang Delhi K.C.
	Scorecard

Dabang Delhi K.C. won by tie-breaker

Match 71
8 October 2025
20:00

Telugu Titans	46 – 29	Haryana Steelers
	Scorecard

Telugu Titans won by 17 points

Match 72
8 October 2025
21:00

Puneri Paltan	37 – 27	U Mumba
	Scorecard

Puneri Paltan won by 10 points

Match 73
9 October 2025
20:00

Bengal Warriorz	37 – 36	Dabang Delhi K.C.
	Scorecard

Bengal Warriorz won by 1 point

Match 74
9 October 2025
21:00

Gujarat Giants	41 – 39	UP Yoddhas
	Scorecard

Gujarat Giants won by 2 points

Match 75
10 October 2025
20:00

Gujarat Giants	33 – 39	Dabang Delhi K.C.
	Scorecard

Dabang Delhi K.C. won by 6 points

Match 76
10 October 2025
21:00

Bengal Warriorz	29 – 48	U Mumba
	Scorecard

U Mumba won by 19 points

=== Leg 4 — Delhi ===
Match 77
11 October 2025
20:00

Bengaluru Bulls	47 – 26	Jaipur Pink Panthers
	Scorecard

Bengaluru Bulls won by 21 points

Match 78
11 October 2025
21:00

Tamil Thalaivas	23 – 36	Puneri Paltan
	Scorecard

Puneri Paltan won by 13 points

Match 79
12 October 2025
20:00

Dabang Delhi K.C.	38 – 38 5 - 6	Puneri Paltan
	Scorecard

Puneri Paltan won by tie-breaker

Match 80
12 October 2025
21:00

Bengal Warriorz	32 – 43	Bengaluru Bulls
	Scorecard

Bengaluru Bulls won by 11 points

Match 81
13 October 2025
20:00

Patna Pirates	32 – 39	Haryana Steelers
	Scorecard

Haryana Steelers won by 7 points

Match 82
13 October 2025
21:00

U Mumba	24 – 40	UP Yoddhas
	Scorecard

UP Yoddhas won by 16 points

Match 83
14 October 2025
20:00

Patna Pirates	32 – 40	Gujarat Giants
	Scorecard

Gujarat Giants won by 8 points

Match 84
14 October 2025
21:00

UP Yoddhas	32 – 31	Tamil Thalaivas
	Scorecard

UP Yoddhas won by 1 point

Match 85
15 October 2025
19:30

Telugu Titans	45 – 45 5 - 7	Bengal Warriorz
	Scorecard

Bengal Warriorz won by tie-breaker

Match 86
15 October 2025
20:30

Jaipur Pink Panthers	33 – 57	Puneri Paltan
	Scorecard

Puneri Paltan won by 24 points

Match 87
15 October 2025
21:30

Gujarat Giants	42 – 35	Tamil Thalaivas
	Scorecard

Gujarat Giants won by 7 points

Match 88
16 October 2025
19:30

Bengaluru Bulls	32 – 32 5 - 6	Patna Pirates
	Scorecard

Patna Pirates won by tie-breaker

Match 89
16 October 2025
20:30

Telugu Titans	26 – 33	U Mumba
	Scorecard

U Mumba won by 7 points

Match 90
16 October 2025
21:30

UP Yoddhas	26 – 53	Haryana Steelers
	Scorecard

Haryana Steelers won by 27 points

Match 91
17 October 2025
19:30

Bengal Warriorz	49 – 51	Patna Pirates
	Scorecard

Patna Pirates won by 2 points

Match 92
17 October 2025
20:30

Tamil Thalaivas	31 – 37	Dabang Delhi K.C.
	Scorecard

Dabang Delhi K.C. won by 6 points

Match 93
17 October 2025
21:30

Jaipur Pink Panthers	42 – 29	UP Yoddhas
	Scorecard

Jaipur Pink Panthers won by 13 points

Match 94
18 October 2025
19:30

Bengaluru Bulls	33 – 23	Dabang Delhi K.C.
	Scorecard

Bengaluru Bulls won by 10 points

Match 95
18 October 2025
20:30

Telugu Titans	40 – 31	Puneri Paltan
	Scorecard

Telugu Titans won by 9 points

Match 96
18 October 2025
21:30

Bengal Warriorz	30 – 38	Jaipur Pink Panthers
	Scorecard

Jaipur Pink Panthers won by 8 points

Match 97
19 October 2025
19:30

Telugu Titans	30 – 25	Gujarat Giants
	Scorecard

Telugu Titans won by 5 points

Match 98
19 October 2025
20:30

U Mumba	37 – 37 7 - 5	Haryana Steelers
	Scorecard

U Mumba won by tie-breaker

Match 99
19 October 2025
21:30

Patna Pirates	38 – 27	Puneri Paltan
	Scorecard

Patna Pirates won by 11 points

Match 100
21 October 2025
19:30

Bengal Warriorz	44 – 43	Tamil Thalaivas
	Scorecard

Bengal Warriorz won by 1 point

Match 101
21 October 2025
20:30

U Mumba	37 – 36	Jaipur Pink Panthers
	Scorecard

U Mumba won by 1 point

Match 102
21 October 2025
21:30

Haryana Steelers	50 – 32	Gujarat Giants
	Scorecard

Haryana Steelers won by 18 points

Match 103
22 October 2025
19:30

Haryana Steelers	45 – 34	Telugu Titans
	Scorecard

Haryana Steelers won by 11 points

Match 104
22 October 2025
20:30

Bengaluru Bulls	54 – 24	Bengal Warriorz
	Scorecard

Bengaluru Bulls won by 30 points

Match 105
22 October 2025
21:30

Dabang Delhi K.C.	26 – 61	Patna Pirates
	Scorecard

Patna Pirates won by 35 points

Match 106
23 October 2025
19:30

Bengaluru Bulls	54 – 26	Gujarat Giants
	Scorecard

Bengaluru Bulls won by 28 points

Match 107
23 October 2025
20:30

UP Yoddhas	35 – 32	U Mumba
	Scorecard

UP Yoddhas won by 3 points

Match 108
23 October 2025
21:30

Patna Pirates	33 – 18	Jaipur Pink Panthers
	Scorecard

Patna Pirates won by 15 points

== Playoffs ==
=== Bracket ===
Qualifier 1
Mini-qualifier	1	Puneri Paltan	34 (4)
Play-in 1	3	Bengaluru Bulls	32	Eliminator 2	2	Dabang Delhi K.C.	34 (6)	Final
5	Haryana Steelers	27	4	Telugu Titans	37	Bengaluru Bulls	37	Dabang Delhi K.C.	31
8	Jaipur Pink Panthers	30	Eliminator 1	Patna Pirates	46	Eliminator 3	Puneri Paltan	28
Play-in 2	Jaipur Pink Panthers	32	Telugu Titans	46	Qualifier 2
6	U Mumba	31	Patna Pirates	48	Patna Pirates	39	Puneri Paltan	50
7	Patna Pirates	40	Telugu Titans	45

=== Play-ins ===
Play-in 1

Match 109
25 October 2025
20:00 (IST)

Haryana Steelers	27 – 30	Jaipur Pink Panthers
Shivam Patare (6R); Neeraj Kumar (5T)	Scorecard	Nitin Kumar (7R); Aryan Kumar (5T)

Jaipur Pink Panthers won by 3 points

Play-in 2

Match 110
25 October 2025
21:00 (IST)

U Mumba	31 – 40	Patna Pirates
Ajit Chavan (12R); Parvesh Bhainswal (3T)	Scorecard	Ayan Lohchab (13R); Navdeep (6T)

Patna Pirates won by 9 points

=== Eliminator 1 ===
Match 111
26 October 2025
20:00 (IST)

Jaipur Pink Panthers	32 – 48	Patna Pirates
Ali Samadi (10R); Aryan Kumar (3T)	Scorecard	Ayan Lohchab (20R); Navdeep (6T)

Patna Pirates won by 16 points

=== Mini-qualifier ===
Match 112
26 October 2025
21:00 (IST)

Bengaluru Bulls	32 – 37	Telugu Titans
Alireza Mirzaian (11R); Satyappa Matti (4T)	Scorecard	Bharat Hooda (12R); Ajit Pawar(2T); Sagar(2T); Aman(2T)

Telugu Titans won by 5 points

=== Eliminator 2 ===
Match 113
27 October 2025
20:00 (IST)

Bengaluru Bulls	37 – 46	Patna Pirates
Shubham Bitake (7R); Deepak Sankar (3T)	Scorecard	Ayan Lohchab (19R); Deepak Rathee (5T); Navdeep (5T)

Patna Pirates won by 9 points

=== Qualifier 1 ===
Match 114
27 October 2025
21:00 (IST)

Puneri Paltan	34 – 34 4 – 6	Dabang Delhi K.C.
Aditya Shinde (10R); Gaurav Khatri (4T)	Scorecard	Neeraj Narwal (7R); Sandeep Deshwal (3T); Saurabh Nandal (3T)

Dabang Delhi K.C. won by tie-breaker

=== Eliminator 3 ===
Match 115
28 October 2025
20:00 (IST)

Telugu Titans	46 – 39	Patna Pirates
Bharat Hooda (23R); Ajit Pawar (3T); Shubham Shinde (3T)	Scorecard	Ayan Lohchab (22R); Navdeep (5T)

Telugu Titans won by 7 points

=== Qualifier 2 ===
Match 116
29 October 2025
20:00 (IST)

Puneri Paltan	50 – 45	Telugu Titans
Aditya Shinde (21R); Gaurav Khatri (5T)	Scorecard	Bharat Hooda (23R); Ankit (3T)

Puneri Paltan won by 5 points

=== Final ===
Match 117
31 October 2025
20:00 (IST)

Dabang Delhi K.C.	31 – 28	Puneri Paltan
Neeraj Narwal (8R); Saurabh Nandal(2T); Surjeet Singh(2T)	Scorecard	Aditya Shinde (10R); Abinesh Nadarajan (4T)

Dabang Delhi K.C. won by 3 points

== Statistics and awards ==
=== Most raid points ===
Rank	Player	Team	Matches	Raid Points
1	(India) Ayan Lohchab	Patna Pirates	22	316
2	(India) Devank Dalal	Bengal Warriorz	16	271
3	(India) Arjun Deshwal	Tamil Thalaivas	18	209
4	(India) Bharat Hooda	Telugu Titans	20	207
5	(Iran) Alireza Mirzain	Bengaluru Bulls	20	197
As of 27 October 2025

=== Most tackle points ===
Rank	Player	Team	Matches	Tackle Points
1	(India) Navdeep	Patna Pirates	21	73
2	(India) Jaideep Dahiya	Haryana Steelers	19	68
3	(India) Nitesh Kumar	Tamil Thalaivas	18	65
4	(India) Deepak Sankar	Bengaluru Bulls	19	64
5	(India) Gaurav Khatri	Puneri Paltan	17	54
As of 27 October 2025

=== End of season awards ===
End of season awards
Award	Prize	Player	Team
Champions	₹3 crore (US$310,000) and PKL trophy	—N/a	Dabang Delhi K.C.
Runners-up	₹1.8 crore (US$190,000)	—N/a	Puneri Paltan
Most Valuable Player of the season	₹20 lakh (US$21,000)	Fazel Atrachali	Dabang Delhi K.C.
Raider of the Season	₹15 lakh (US$16,000)	Ayan Lohchab	Patna Pirates
Defender of the Season	₹15 lakh (US$16,000)	Navdeep Singh	Patna Pirates
New Young Player of the Season	₹8 lakh (US$8,300)	Deepak Sankar	Bengaluru Bulls
Shriram Finance Tackle of the Season	₹5 lakh (US$5,200)	Sunil Kumar	U Mumba
Birla White Tiles Super Tackle of the Season	₹5 lakh (US$5,200)	Shankar Gadai	Telugu Titans
Shriram Finance Tackle Of the Final	₹50,000 (US$520)	Fazel Atrachali	Dabang Delhi K.C.
