= Mohammad Reza Shadloui =

Iranian kabaddi player

Mohammad Reza Shadloui Chiyaneh
Personal information
- Nationality: Iranian
- Born: 14 May 2000 (age 26) Naghadeh, Iran

Sport
- Country: Iran
- Sport: Kabaddi
- Position: Defender
- League: Pro Kabaddi League
- Club: Patna Pirates (2021-2022); Puneri Paltan (2023); Haryana Steelers (2024); Gujarat Giants (2025-present)
- Team: Iran national kabaddi team
Medal record
Representing Iran
Men's Kabaddi
Asian Games
| Silver medal – second place | 2022 Hangzhou | team |
| Silver medal – second place | 2026 Aichi–Nagoya | team |
Asian Championship
| Silver medal – second place | 2023 Busan | Team |

Mohammad Reza Shadloui Chianeh (Persian: محمدرضا شادلو چیانه; born 14 May 2000) is an Iranian kabaddi player who plays as a defender for Iran in international matches and for Gujarat Giants in the Indian Pro Kabaddi League. He rose to prominence as a reliable defender in the Pro Kabaddi League, as he racked up 177 tackle points from his first 45 matches in the PKL.

== International career ==
Shadloui was a member of the Iran junior kabaddi team which claimed the gold medal at the 2019 Junior World Kabaddi Championship.

He was named in Iran's squad as part of their 14-member preparatory camp staged in August 2023 on the Iranian island of Kish prior to the start of the 2022 Asian Games. He represented Iran at the 2022 Asian Games, captaining the Iranian national kabaddi squad which emerged as runners-up to India in the final.

== PKL career ==
Shadloui was bought by the Patna Pirates for the 2021–22 Pro Kabaddi League and had a successful stint in his maiden season, scoring the most tackle points by any player (89). The Patna Pirates reached the finals of the 2021-22 PKL season but fell short of the championship after losing to Dabang Delhi.

He was retained by Patna Pirates for the following 2022 PKL season and had another strong season, scoring the second most tackle points in the league with 84 points in 20 matches. He was later released by Patna Pirates just before the 2023-24 PKL season.

Shadloui became the most expensive overseas player in the history of the Pro Kabaddi League when he was bought by Puneri Paltan for a record price of ₹2.35 crore during the 2023 PKL auction prior to the 2023–24 PKL season. He played a pivotal role in Puneri Paltan's first PKL championship, with his team defeating Haryana Steelers in the final. He scored the most tackle points by any player at the 2023–24 Pro Kabaddi League with 99 points and also made the most successful tackles with a tally of 97.

Haryana Steelers released Shadloui to the auction after the 2024–2025 season. In the 2025 player auction, Shadloui was bought by Gujarat Giants for ₹2.23 crore, once again making him the most expensive foreign player in the auction.

== Career Statistics ==
Updated as of 5 September 2026

| Team | Season | League | Apps | Raid Points | Super 10s | Tackle Points | High 5s | Total Points |
|---|---|---|---|---|---|---|---|---|
| Patna Pirates | 2021–22 | Pro Kabaddi League | 24 | 5 | 0 | 89 | 10 | 94 |
| Patna Pirates | 2022 | Pro Kabaddi League | 20 | 5 | 0 | 84 | 6 | 89 |
| Patna Pirates | Total | | 44 | 10 | 0 | 173 | 16 | 183 |
| Puneri Paltan | 2023–24 | Pro Kabaddi League | 24 | 27 | 0 | 99 | 11 | 126 |
| Haryana Steelers | 2024 | Pro Kabaddi League | 24 | 57 | 0 | 82 | 5 | 139 |
| Gujarat Giants | 2025 | Pro Kabaddi League | 17 | 28 | 0 | 37 | 2 | 65 |
| Career total | | | 109 | 122 | 0 | 391 | 34 | 513 |

== Honours ==
Patna Pirates

- Pro Kabaddi League runner-up: 2021

Puneri Paltan

- Pro Kabaddi League: 2023

Haryana Steelers

- Pro Kabaddi League: 2024
