= Kabaddi at the 2026 Asian Games – Men's tournament =

Men's Kabaddi at the 2026 Asian Games
- Venue: Tōkai Citizens Gymnasium
- Date: 21–26 September 2026
- Nations: 10

Medalists
gold medal	India
silver medal	Iran
bronze medal	Thailand
bronze medal	Chinese Taipei

Men's Kabaddi at the 2026 Asian Games was held at Tōkai Citizens Gymnasium, Tōkai, Japan in 21–26 September 2026.

== Squads ==
India	Chinese Taipei	Bangladesh	Iran
Arjun Deshwal; Devank; Jaideep; Rahul; Ayan; Sumit; Sunil Kumar; Ankit; Pawan Kumar; Gaurav Khatri; Aslam Inamdar; Ashu Malik	Peng Xian-ya; Tsai Chung-hao; Su Hsiang-chih; Chuang Chia-ming; Lin Po-ting; Jin Wu Fu-kai; Yeh Jiunn-ming; Wang Lun-chu; Li Jyun-jie; Chang Chung-mao; Chen Zheng-wei; Cai Ruei-chen	Md Mijanur Rahman; Monirul Chowdhury; Md Sabuj Mia; Md Roman Hossain; Md Nasir Uddin Sharif; Al Amin; Dipayon Golder; Md Rasel Hasan; Md Nesar Howlader; Md Julfiker Akash; Md Hasibul Hossain; Razu Sheikh	Fazel Atrachali; Mohammad Esmaeil Nabibakhsh; Reza Mirbagheri; Omid Khojastehmohammadshah; Amir Hossein Taghipour; Amirreza Aliakbari; Alireza Mirzaiean; Mohammad Reza Shadloui; Ali Samadi Choubtarash; Amir Hossein Bastami; Amir Hossein Ejlali; Amir Mohammad Zafar Danesh
Japan	South Korea	Thailand	Pakistan
Yuta Kaneko; Tetsuro Abe; Etsuki Manita; Daiki Aratake; Hiroto Chiba; Hyuma Kurashima; Ryo Furihata; Yuten Kawate; Shoya Suzuki; Fumitaka Sato; Hiroki Natsuyoshi; Yuta Osawa	Byeon Min-soo; Huh Hyeon-min; Kim Han-eol; Lee Jang-kun; Kim Keon-myeong; Ku Ji-won; Kim Ju-hwan; Kim Dong-gyu; Kim Dong-woo; Lee Dong-geon; Choi Jong-hoon; Jang Hyung-jin	Tanongsak Srihera; Wisat Wuttari; Nopphadon Pontaisong; Somboon Kaewkampon; Pramot Saising; Chayaphon Kamunee; Nithiphat Phikhrao; Saharat Phetchui; Rattanakon Yotsungnoen; Supawit Somrat; Theeradet Chaisit; Khomkrit Jittiang	Faizan Ali; Muhammad Usman Arshad; Muhammad Zohaib Niaz; Muhammad Qasim; Farhan Ali; Muhammad Umair Naseem; Akhlaq Ahmed; Usman Ahmad; Afaq Khan; Shoaib Mumtaz Ali; Mudassar Ali; Bilal Khan
Nepal	Malaysia		
Rabi Tharu; Anku Pun; Sagar Yadav; Aaditya Chaudhary; Ashok Joshi; Karun Rasaili; Prakash Giri; Suraj Bohara; Kumar Lama; Ghanshyam Roka Magar; Ganesh Parki; Sanskar Kumar	Harvison Loud Lourdasamy; Muralitaran Suresh; Navin Kannan; Prithiswaran Kaliyappan; Vicram Ravidran; Navinessh Ragunathen; Sivabalan Ravichandran; Devinthirakumaar Vijayan Kumaran; Navindran Subramaniam; Suresh Kim Seng Leong; Nashwein Nair Kumaran; Madhava Rao Rama Naidu		

== Group stage ==
Group A
Pos	Team	Pld	W	D	L	PF	PA	PD	Pts	Qualification	IND	TPE	JPN	BAN	KOR
1	India	4	4	0	0	197	101	+96	8	Semifinals	—	37–21	49–24	48–25	63–31
2	Chinese Taipei	4	2	0	2	145	152	−7	4	Semifinals		—	34–30	47–48	43–37
3	Japan (H)	4	2	0	2	156	155	+1	4				—	40–37	62–35
4	Bangladesh	4	2	0	2	149	170	−21	4					—	39–35
5	South Korea	4	0	0	4	138	207	−69	0						—

Source: Asian Games 2026
Legend: Blue = home team win; Yellow = draw; Red = away team win.
(H) Hosts
- Note: Chinese Taipei advanced to semifinals due to better head-to-head record with Bangladesh and Japan (Head-to-head point difference: TPE +3, JPN -1, BAN -2).

21 September
9:30

Bangladesh	39–35 (HT: 17–16)	South Korea

Tokai Citizen Gymnasium, Tokai

21 September
13:15

Japan	24–49 (HT: 9–31)	India

Tokai Citizen Gymnasium, Tokai

21 September
18:30

Bangladesh	48–47 (HT: 24–20)	Chinese Taipei

Tokai Citizen Gymnasium, Tokai

22 September
10:45

South Korea	31–63 (HT: 14–34)	India

Tokai Citizen Gymnasium, Tokai

22 September
16:00

Bangladesh	37–40 (HT: 15–22)	Japan

Tokai Citizen Gymnasium, Tokai

23 September
9:30

South Korea	37–43 (HT: 18–19)	Chinese Taipei

Tokai Citizen Gymnasium, Tokai

23 September
13:15

Bangladesh	25–48 (HT: 9–29)	India

Tokai Citizen Gymnasium, Tokai

23 September
18:30

Chinese Taipei	34–30 (HT: 16–13)	Japan

Tokai Citizen Gymnasium, Tokai

24 September
10:45

South Korea	35–62 (HT: 15–34)	Japan

Tokai Citizen Gymnasium, Tokai

24 September
13:15

Chinese Taipei	21–37 (HT: 11–23)	India

Tokai Citizen Gymnasium, Tokai

Group B
Pos	Team	Pld	W	D	L	PF	PA	PD	Pts	Qualification	IRI	THA	PAK	NEP	MAS
1	Iran	4	4	0	0	277	113	+164	8	Semifinals	—	83–27	51–30	76–23	67–33
2	Thailand	4	3	0	1	200	199	+1	6	Semifinals		—	48–45	59–48	66–23
3	Pakistan	4	2	0	2	198	164	+34	4				—	58–43	65–22
4	Nepal	4	1	0	3	187	245	−58	2					—	73–52
5	Malaysia	4	0	0	4	130	271	−141	0						—

Source: Asian Games 2026
Legend: Blue = home team win; Yellow = draw; Red = away team win.

21 September
10:45

Nepal	48–59 (HT: 24–28)	Thailand

Tokai Citizen Gymnasium, Tokai

21 September
16:00

Pakistan	65–22 (HT: 38–11)	Malaysia

Tokai Citizen Gymnasium, Tokai

22 September
9:30

Nepal	43–58 (HT: 17–30)	Pakistan

Tokai Citizen Gymnasium, Tokai

22 September
13:15

Thailand	66–23 (HT: 37–9)	Malaysia

Tokai Citizen Gymnasium, Tokai

22 September
18:30

Nepal	23–76 (HT: 7–40)	Iran

Tokai Citizen Gymnasium, Tokai

23 September
10:45

Malaysia	33–67 (HT: 16–37)	Iran

Tokai Citizen Gymnasium, Tokai

23 September
16:00

Thailand	48–45 (HT: 16–23)	Pakistan

Tokai Citizen Gymnasium, Tokai

24 September
9:30

Thailand	27–83 (HT: 15–43)	Iran

Tokai Citizen Gymnasium, Tokai

24 September
16:00

Nepal	73–52 (HT: 37–21)	Malaysia

Tokai Citizen Gymnasium, Tokai

24 September
18:30

Pakistan	30–51 (HT: 14–20)	Iran

Tokai Citizen Gymnasium, Tokai

=== Knockout round ===
Semifinals
25 September
India	66
Thailand	28
25 September
Iran	59
Chinese Taipei	21

Gold medal match
26 September
India	40
Iran	34

==== Semifinals ====
25 September
14:15

India	66–28 (HT: 37–18)	Thailand

Tokai Citizen Gymnasium, Tokai

25 September
19:15

Chinese Taipei	21–59 (HT: 8–32)	Iran

Tokai Citizen Gymnasium, Tokai

==== Gold medal match ====
26 September
18:00

India	40–34 (HT: 17–18)	Iran

Tokai Citizen Gymnasium, Tokai

== Final standing ==
Rank	Team	Pld	W	D	L
1st place, gold medalist(s)	India	6	6	0	0
2nd place, silver medalist(s)	Iran	6	5	0	1
3rd place, bronze medalist(s)	Thailand	5	3	0	2
3rd place, bronze medalist(s)	Chinese Taipei	5	2	0	3
5	Bangladesh	4	2	0	2
5	Pakistan	4	2	0	2
7	Japan	4	2	0	2
7	Nepal	4	1	0	3
9	South Korea	4	0	0	4
9	Malaysia	4	0	0	4

== See also ==
- Kabaddi at the 2026 Asian Games – Women's tournament
