= UP Yoddhas =

Professional kabaddi team in Uttar Pradesh, India

- Full name: UP Yoddhas
- Short name: UPY
- Sport: Kabaddi
- Founded: 2017
- First season: 2017
- Last season: 2024
- League: Pro Kabaddi League
- Based in: Lucknow
- Location: Uttar Pradesh
- Arena: Shaheed Vijay Singh Pathik Sports Complex
- Colours
- Anthem: Hum Hai Yoddha (We are warriors)
- Owner: GMR Group
- Head coach: Jasveer Singh (Resigned)
- Captain: (India) Sumit Sangwan
- Playoff berths: 5
- Assistant coach: Upendra Malik
- Website: https://upyoddhas.com/

UP Yoddhas (Previously known as UP Yoddha) is a professional kabaddi team of Pro Kabaddi League, based in Lucknow, Uttar Pradesh. It is owned by the GMR Group. It was founded in 2017.

The Yoddhas play their home matches at Babu Banarasi Das Indoor Stadium, Lucknow. The team made it to the playoffs in every season since its inception in 2017 until 2023-24 PKL.

== Current squad ==
Full Squad of UP Yoddha for Pro Kabaddi League Session 12,2025.

No	Name	Nat	Position
10	Sumit Sangwan (c)	(India)	Defender - Left Corner
44	Ashu Singh (vc)	(India)	Defender - Right Cover
9	Bhavani Rajput	(India)	Raider
11	Surender Gill	(India)	Raider
7	Gagana Gowda	(India)	Right Raider
	Keshav Kumar	(India)	Right Raider
	Shivam Chaudhary	(India)	Left Raider
25	Guman Singh	(India)	Raider
	Jatin Singh	(India)	Right Raider
	Pranay Vinay Rane	(India)	Raider
22	Dong Lee	(South Korea)	Raider
	Sachin Manipal	(India)	Defender - Right Cover
1	Sahul Kumar	(India)	Defender - Right Corner
4	Mahender Singh	(India)	Defender - Left Cover
	Gangaram	(India)	Left Cover
79	Hitesh	(India)	Right Corner
	Jayesh Mahajan	(India)	Defender - Left Corner
	Mahommadreza Kaboudrahangi	(Iran)	Defender - Left Corner
	Ronak Nain	(India)	Left Cover
Source: Pro Kabaddi

=== Head coach record ===
Name	Nationality	From	To	P	W	D	L	Win%
Jasvir Singh	India	2017	present	1	1	0	0	100.00

== Seasons ==
=== Season V ===
The teams are divided into two zones with each zone having six teams based on their geographical proximity. Each team will play 15 intra-zonal matches and 7 inter-zonal matches.
Zone A

Team	Pld	W	L	D	SD	Pts
Gujarat Fortune Giants (R)	22	15	4	3	126	87
Puneri Paltan	22	15	7	0	91	80
Haryana Steelers	22	13	5	4	40	79
U Mumba	22	10	12	0	-50	56
Jaipur Pink Panthers	22	8	13	1	-91	51
Dabang Delhi KC	22	5	16	1	-134	29

Zone B

Team	Pld	W	L	D	SD	Pts
Bengal Warriors	22	11	5	6	19	77
Patna Pirates (C)	22	10	7	5	60	71
UP Yoddha	22	8	10	4	2	60
Bengaluru Bulls	22	8	11	3	10	57
Telugu Titans	22	7	12	3	-2	52
Tamil Thalaivas	22	6	14	2	-71	46

Source: ProKabaddi

- advanced to Qualifier 1
- advanced to Eliminators
- Five points for a win
- Three points each for a drawn game
- One point for a loss by 7 points or fewer

=== Season VI ===
The teams are divided into two zones with each zone having six teams based on their geographical proximity. Each team will play 15 intra-zonal matches and 7 inter-zonal matches.
Zone A

Team	Pld	W	L	D	SD	Pts
Gujarat Fortune Giants (R)	22	17	3	2	117	93
U Mumba	22	15	5	2	189	86
Dabang Delhi KC	22	11	9	2	-1	68
Puneri Paltan	22	8	12	2	-45	52
Jaipur Pink Panthers	22	6	13	3	-69	43
Haryana Steelers	22	6	14	2	-91	42

Zone B

Team	Pld	W	L	D	SD	Pts
Bengaluru Bulls (C)	22	13	7	2	104	78
Bengal Warriors	22	12	8	2	2	69
UP Yoddha	22	8	10	4	-45	57
Patna Pirates	22	9	11	2	-36	55
Telugu Titans	22	8	13	1	-55	51
Tamil Thalaivas	22	5	13	4	-70	42

Source: ProKabaddi

- advanced to Qualifier 1
- advanced to Eliminators
- Five points for a win
- Three points each for a drawn game
- One point for a loss by 7 points or fewer
- Top three teams from each zone qualify for the playoffs

=== Season VII ===
Team	Pld	W	L	D	SD	Pts
Dabang Delhi KC (R)	22	15	4	3	66	85
Bengal Warriors (C)	22	14	5	3	71	83
UP Yoddha	22	13	7	2	9	74
U Mumba	22	12	8	2	47	72
Haryana Steelers	22	13	8	1	15	71
Bengaluru Bulls	22	11	10	1	16	64
Jaipur Pink Panthers	22	9	11	2	-13	58
Patna Pirates	22	8	13	1	29	51
Gujarat Forunte Giants	22	7	13	2	18	51
Puneri Paltan	22	7	12	3	-72	48
Telugu Titans	22	6	13	3	-67	45
Tamil Thalaivas	22	4	15	3	-119	37

Source: ProKabaddi

- advanced to Finals
- advanced to Eliminators
- Five points for a win
- Three points each for a drawn game
- One point for a loss by 7 points or fewer
- Top 6 teams qualify for the playoffs

=== Season VIII ===
Pos	Team	Pld	W	L	T	SD	Pts	
1	Patna Pirates (R)	22	16	5	1	120	86	Qualification to semi finals
2	Dabang Delhi (C)	22	12	6	4	-3	75	Qualification to semi finals
3	UP Yoddha	22	10	9	3	33	68	Qualification to eliminators
4	Gujarat Giants	22	10	8	4	2	67	Qualification to eliminators
5	Bengaluru Bulls	22	11	9	2	53	66	Qualification to eliminators
6	Puneri Paltan	22	12	9	1	33	66	Qualification to eliminators
7	Haryana Steelers	22	10	9	3	-28	64	
8	Jaipur Pink Panthers	22	10	10	2	14	63	
9	Bengal Warriors	22	9	10	3	-18	57	
10	U Mumba	22	7	10	5	-34	55	
11	Tamil Thalaivas	22	5	11	6	-42	47	
12	Telugu Titans	22	1	17	4	-130	27	

Updated to match(es) played on 25 February 2022. Source: ProKabaddi
(C) Champion; (R) Runners Up
- Five points for a win
- Three points each for a drawn game
- One point for a loss by 7 points or fewer

=== Season IX ===
Pos	Team	Pld	W	L	T	SD	Pts	
1	Jaipur Pink Panthers (C)	22	15	6	1	174	82	Qualification to semi finals
2	Puneri Paltan (R)	22	14	6	2	66	80	Qualification to semi finals
3	Bengaluru Bulls	22	13	8	1	39	74	Qualification to eliminators
4	UP Yoddha	22	12	8	2	42	71	Qualification to eliminators
5	Tamil Thalaivas	22	10	8	4	5	66	Qualification to eliminators
6	Dabang Delhi	22	10	10	2	17	63	Qualification to eliminators
7	Haryana Steelers	22	10	10	2	16	61	
8	Gujarat Giants	22	9	11	2	-16	59	
9	U Mumba	22	10	12	0	-28	56	
10	Patna Pirates	22	8	11	3	-58	54	
11	Bengal Warriors	22	8	11	3	-12	53	
12	Telugu Titans	22	2	20	0	-245	15	

Source: ProKabaddi
(C) Champion; (R) Runners Up
- 5 points for a win
- 3 points for a tied game
- 1 point for a loss by 7 points or fewer

=== Season X ===
Pos	Team	Pld	W	L	T	SD	Pts	
1	Puneri Paltan (C)	22	17	2	3	253	96	Qualification to semi finals
2	Jaipur Pink Panthers	22	16	3	3	141	92	Qualification to semi finals
3	Dabang Delhi	22	13	6	3	53	79	Qualification to eliminators
4	Gujarat Giants	22	13	9	0	32	70	Qualification to eliminators
5	Haryana Steelers (R)	22	13	8	1	-13	70	Qualification to eliminators
6	Patna Pirates	22	11	8	3	50	69	Qualification to eliminators
7	Bengal Warriors	22	9	11	2	-43	55	
8	Bengaluru Bulls	22	8	12	2	-67	53	
9	Tamil Thalaivas	22	9	13	0	32	51	
10	U Mumba	22	6	13	3	-79	45	
11	UP Yoddhas	22	4	17	1	-116	31	
12	Telugu Titans	22	2	19	1	-243	21	

Source: ProKabaddi
Rules for classification:
- 5 points for a win
- 3 points for a tied game
- 1 point for a loss by 7 points or fewer
(C) Champion; (R) Runners Up

== Records ==
Seasons	Total	Wins	Losses	Tied	% Win	Position
Season 5	23	8	15	11	43.48%	3
Season 6	25	10	15	11	48.00%	3
Season 7	23	13	10	8	60.87%	3
Season 8	22	10	9	3	45.00%	3
Season 9	22	12	8	2	54.54%	4
Season 10	22	4	17	1	18.18%	11

=== By opposition ===
Note: Table lists in alphabetical order.

Opposition	Played	Won	Lost	Drawn	% Win
Bengal Warriors	14	4	5	5	28.6%
Bengaluru Bulls	15	6	9	0	40.0%
Dabang Delhi	10	6	4	0	60.0%
Gujarat Fortune Giants	10	2	6	2	20.0%
Haryana Steelers	9	4	3	2	44.4%
Jaipur Pink Panthers	10	5	5	0	50.0%
Patna Pirates	14	5	8	1	35.7%
Puneri Paltan	11	6	5	0	54.5%
Tamil Thalaivas	14	5	6	3	35.7%
Telugu Titans	13	9	2	2	69.2%
U Mumba	11	5	5	1	45.5%
Total	131	57	58	16	43.5%

== Sponsors ==
Year	Season	Kit manufacturer	Main sponsor	Back sponsor	Sleeve sponsor
2017	V	T10 Sports	Tata Yodha	Karbonn Mobiles	GMR
2018	VI	T10 Sports	Tata Yodha	Suzuki Access 125	Captain Morgan Cola
2019	VII	T10 Sports	Tata Yodha	Valvoline	GMR
2021	VIII	Sqad Gear	ABP News	Iodex	GMR
2022	IX	Shiv-Naresh	Fantasy Akhada	Batwinner	GMR
2023	X	Shiv-Naresh	Vision11	Citykart	Royal Enfield
2024	XI	Shiv-Naresh	DafaNews	Ananda	Royal Enfield
2025	XII	PlayR	Hero FinCorp	Encalm Lounge	Ofis Square

== See also ==
- Delhi Capitals
