= Kabaddi at the 2022 Asian Games – Men's tournament =

Men at the 2022 Asian Games
- Venue: Xiaoshan Guali Sports Centre
- Date: 2–7 October 2023
- Competitors: 104 from 9 nations

Medalists
gold medal	India
silver medal	Iran
bronze medal	Pakistan
bronze medal	Chinese Taipei

Men's Kabaddi at the 2022 Asian Games was held at Guali Sports Centre, Xiaoshan District, China from 2 to 7 October 2023.

== Squads ==
Bangladesh	Chinese Taipei	India	Iran
Tuhin Tarafder; Mijanur Rahman; Monirul Chowdhury; Sabuj Mia; Arif Rabbani; Al Amin; Roman Hossain; Rasel Hasan; Mohammad Nasir Uddin; Razib Ahamed; Liton Ali; Sha Mohammed Shahan	Huang Tzu-ming; Li Hao-wei; Lin I-ching; Chang Chia-ming; Li Jyun-jie; Yu Hao-cheng; Wu Wei-jheng; Wang Lunchu; Huang Jih-hung; Chang Chung-mao; Chen Zheng-wei; Tsai Chung-hao	Nitesh Kumar; Aslam Inamdar; Nitin Rawal; Parvesh Bhainswal; Surjeet Singh Narwal; Vishal Bhardwaj; Naveen Kumar; Sunil Kumar; Pawan Sehrawat; Arjun Deshwal; Akash Shinde; Sachin Tanwar	Fazel Atrachali; Mohammad Esmaeil Nabibakhsh; Milad Jabbari; Hamid Mirzaei; Reza Mirbagheri; Amir Hossein Bastami; Alireza Mirzaeian; Mohammad Reza Shadloo; Moein Shafaghi; Mohammad Kazem Nasseri; Mohammad Reza Kaboudarahangi; Amir Mohammad Zafardanesh
Japan	Malaysia	Pakistan	South Korea
Garyo Kono; Etsuki Manita; Tetsuro Abe; Kazuhiro Takano; Masaki Hatakeyama; Masayuki Shimokawa; Yuten Kawate; Hiroto Chiba; Daiki Aratake; Hyuma Kurashima	Thinesh Raaj Gopolan; Kovalan Kesavan; Alif Asri Buang; Jatheesvar Krishnan; Mohanraj Batumaly; Kaarthik Guna; Viknesshwaran Gunaseelan; Devinthirakumaar Vijayan Kumaran; Dhaanushruban Raveechandran; Shachien Remesi; Allexson Lian Sin; Evaraj Velayutham	Mudassar Ali; Tahseen Ullah; Sajjad Shaukat; Adil Hussain; Akhlaq Ahmed; Muzammil Zafar; Umair Khan; Usman Ahmed; Muhammad Imran; Waqar Ali; Mazhar Iqbal; Muhammad Safian	Byeon Min-soo; Kyung Ha-yeon; Kim Seung-ju; Jang Hyung-jin; An Jun-seok; Lee Won-hee; Kim Dong-woo; Jung Min-hyuk; Jung Eun-chan; Kim Ju-hwan
Thailand			
Thanongsak Srihera; Nattapong Jantajam; Rattanakon Yotsungnoen; Chanwit Wichian; Chakrit Nuchaikaew; Pramot Saising; Chayaphon Kamunee; Theeradet Chaisit; Nopphadon Pontaisong; Chakkaphod Chongkaichak; Hasun Thongkruea; Peeradach Jantajam			

== Results ==
All times are China Standard Time (UTC+08:00)

=== Preliminary round ===
==== Group A ====
Pos	Team	Pld	W	D	L	PF	PA	PD	Pts	Qualification
1	India	4	4	0	0	224	101	+123	8	Semifinals
2	Chinese Taipei	4	3	0	1	141	114	+27	6	Semifinals
3	Bangladesh	4	2	0	2	133	132	+1	4	
4	Thailand	4	1	0	3	124	184	−60	2	
5	Japan	4	0	0	4	100	191	−91	0	

Source: Official website

2 October
8:30

Japan	17–52 (HT: 5–25)	Bangladesh

Xiaoshan Guali Sports Centre, Hangzhou

2 October
9:30

Thailand	24–45 (HT: 13–19)	Chinese Taipei

Xiaoshan Guali Sports Centre, Hangzhou

3 October
8:30

India	55–18 (HT: 24–9)	Bangladesh

Xiaoshan Guali Sports Centre, Hangzhou

3 October
9:40

Chinese Taipei	38–22 (HT: 18–8)	Japan

Xiaoshan Guali Sports Centre, Hangzhou

4 October
8:30

India	63–26 (HT: 37–9)	Thailand

Xiaoshan Guali Sports Centre, Hangzhou

4 October
9:30

Chinese Taipei	31–18 (HT: 10–8)	Bangladesh

Xiaoshan Guali Sports Centre, Hangzhou

5 October
9:30

Thailand	45–31 (HT: 20–18)	Japan

Xiaoshan Guali Sports Centre, Hangzhou

5 October
10:35

India	50–27 (HT: 28–12)	Chinese Taipei

Xiaoshan Guali Sports Centre, Hangzhou

5 October
15:00

Bangladesh	45–29 (HT: 24–12)	Thailand

Xiaoshan Guali Sports Centre, Hangzhou

5 October
16:10

Japan	30–56 (HT: 11–35)	India

Xiaoshan Guali Sports Centre, Hangzhou

==== Group B ====
Pos	Team	Pld	W	D	L	PF	PA	PD	Pts	Qualification
1	Iran	3	3	0	0	160	62	+98	6	Semifinals
2	Pakistan	3	2	0	1	130	99	+31	4	Semifinals
3	Malaysia	3	1	0	2	98	149	−51	2	
4	South Korea	3	0	0	3	82	160	−78	0	

Source: Official website

2 October
14:00

Iran	43–16 (HT: 24–7)	Pakistan

Xiaoshan Guali Sports Centre, Hangzhou

2 October
15:00

South Korea	38–40 (HT: 22–14)	Malaysia

Xiaoshan Guali Sports Centre, Hangzhou

3 October
14:00

Malaysia	23–53 (HT: 11–31)	Iran

Xiaoshan Guali Sports Centre, Hangzhou

3 October
15:00

Pakistan	56–21 (HT: 33–10)	South Korea

Xiaoshan Guali Sports Centre, Hangzhou

4 October
14:00

Iran	64–23 (HT: 31–8)	South Korea

Xiaoshan Guali Sports Centre, Hangzhou

4 October
15:10

Malaysia	35–58 (HT: 10–30)	Pakistan

Xiaoshan Guali Sports Centre, Hangzhou

=== Knockout round ===
Semifinals
6 October
India	61
Pakistan	14
6 October
Iran	47
Chinese Taipei	24

Gold medal match
7 October
India	33
Iran	29

==== Semifinals ====
6 October
15:00

India	61–14 (HT: 30–5)	Pakistan

Xiaoshan Guali Sports Centre, Hangzhou

6 October
16:00

Iran	47–24 (HT: 25–7)	Chinese Taipei

Xiaoshan Guali Sports Centre, Hangzhou

==== Gold medal match ====
7 October
15:00

India	33–29 (HT: 17–13)	Iran

Xiaoshan Guali Sports Centre, Hangzhou

== Final standing ==
Rank	Team	Pld	W	D	L
1st place, gold medalist(s)	India	6	6	0	0
2nd place, silver medalist(s)	Iran	5	4	0	1
3rd place, bronze medalist(s)	Chinese Taipei	5	3	0	2
3rd place, bronze medalist(s)	Pakistan	4	2	0	2
5	Bangladesh	4	2	0	2
5	Malaysia	3	1	0	2
7	South Korea	3	0	0	3
7	Thailand	4	1	0	3
9	Japan	4	0	0	4
