= Fazel Atrachali =

Iranian kabaddi player (born 1992)

Personal information
- Born: 29 March 1992 (age 34) Mohammadabad, Gorgan, Iran
- Occupation: Kabaddi player
- Years active: 2010–present
- Height: 1.82 m (6 ft 0 in)
- Weight: 82 kg (181 lb)
- Spouse: Shazia Sultana Atrachali

Sport
- Country: Iran
- Sport: Kabaddi
- Position: Defender left corner
- Kabaddi: Pro Kabaddi League
- Club: U Mumba (2015–2016), (2018–2021); Patna Pirates (2016); Gujarat Giants (2017, 2023); Puneri Paltan (2022); Bengal Warriors (2024); Dabang Delhi (2025)
- Team: Iran National Kabaddi Team
- Coached by: Gholamreza Mazandarani
Medal record
Men's kabaddi
Representing Iran
Asian Games
Gold medal – first place	2018 Jakarta-Palembang	Team
Silver medal – second place	2010 Guangzhou	Team
Silver medal – second place	2014 Incheon	Team
Silver medal – second place	2022 Hangzhou	Team
Silver medal – second place	2026 Aichi–Nagoya	Team
Kabaddi World Cup
Silver medal – second place	2016 Ahmadabad	Team

Fazel Atrachali (Persian: فاضل اتراچالی, born 29 March 1992) is an Iranian kabaddi player who currently plays for Dabang Delhi in the Pro Kabaddi League and the Iran National kabaddi team.

Atrachali is one of the most successful foreign players in the history of the Pro Kabaddi League and is currently the only foreign player to rank among the top 10 tackle points scorer in league history. In the 4th edition of the VIVO Pro Kabaddi league, he won the award of the Best Defender of the Season award. He is the highest-paid foreign player in the Pro Kabaddi League. He has 500 tackle points in Pro Kabaddi League. He is the top tackle point scorer and the most successful captain in PKL history. Atrachali, Manjeet Chhillar, and Mohammadreza Chiyaneh are the only defenders in PKL history who have won the Defender of the Tournament award twice.

== Early life ==
Atrachali started playing kabaddi from the young age of 11 in his hometown Gorgan in Iran. He has represented his country in the 2010 and 2014 Asian games, and even captained the national team in the 2014 games. Before entering into Pro Kabaddi League, he used to work as a blacksmith in his hometown as a side profession. He played the Asian Indoor Games in 2013. When not training hard on the mats or busy at work in the office, Atrachali enjoys wrestling in his free time.

== Kabaddi career ==
=== Pro Kabaddi ===
==== Season 2 ====
Atrachali made his VIVO Pro Kabaddi debut against Dabang Delhi in U Mumba's 29–25 win in Hyderabad, where he scored two tackle points. In his second outing, he scored a season-high of seven points against Puneri Paltan in his team's 39–34 victory. Atrachali featured in five matches in Season 2, scoring 12 points.

==== Season 3 ====
Atrachali was a much more prominent figure in U Mumba's roster in Season 3 and featured 11 times, scoring 32 tackle points and one raid point. He had a tackle success rate of 50% and was U Mumba's second-highest scoring defender of the campaign.

==== Season 4 ====
Atrachali moved to the Patna Pirates for Season 4 and blossomed into one of the league's best defenders. He finished the season as the leading tackle point scorer with 52 in 16 matches, which included four High 5s and seven Super Tackles. He won the VIVO Pro Kabaddi title with the Patna Pirates and was also awarded the Best Defender Award.

==== Season 5 ====
The left corner joined new franchise Gujarat Fortunegiants for Season 5 and enjoyed another stellar individual campaign. He scored 57 tackle points, with five High 5s and three Super Tackles at a tackle strike rate of 57.57 in 24 matches. He led the Fortunegiants to the final where they were beaten by Patna Pirates.

==== Season 6 ====
U Mumba re-signed Atrachali from the Season 6 auction and named him captain. Atrachali featured in all of U Mumba's 23 matches and finished with 83 tackle points with six High 5s and three Super Tackles. He finished third in the race for Best Defender behind Nitesh Kumar and Parvesh Bhainswal.

==== Season 7 ====
U Mumba retained Atrachali for PKL 7. He led the team to the semifinal where they eventually lost to Bengal Warriors. Atrachali enjoyed a decent season, finishing the league as the Best Defender with 82 tackle points. His best performance came against Haryana Steelers, where he scored 8 tackle points.

==== Season 8 ====
Atrachali was once again retained by U Mumba and continued as their Captain. The team finished tenth in the league with Atrachali scoring 51 tackle points.

==== Season 9 ====
In Season 9, Atrachali was picked up by Puneri Paltan for 1.38 crore. He scored 56 tackle points in that season, with Puneri Paltan emerging as the runners-up, losing to Jaipur Pink Panthers in the final.

==== Season 10 ====
In Season 10, Atrachali was signed by Gujarat Giants for a sum of 1.6 crore, securing 66 tackle points in that season.

==== Season 11 ====
Bengal Warriors signed Atrachali for 50 lakhs. Atrachali had an impressive outing, securing 63 tackle points in that season. On 29 October 2024, while playing against Puneri Paltan he became the first player in PKL history to achieve 500 tackle points, the most by any defender.

==== Season 12 ====
In Season 12, Atrachali was picked up by Dabang Delhi for his base price of 30 lakhs. He scored 52 tackle points in 19 matches and was the MVP of the tournament. He won the championship with Dabang Delhi K.C. as vice captain of the team while also captaining the team in a few matches and handling the team in pressure situations.

=== International ===
Atrachali was part of Iran's World Cup team that lost in the final to India and was also a member of the Asian Games Gold Medal Winning team, of which he was the captain.

== Records and achievements ==
- VIVO Pro Kabaddi Best Defender (2016) - Season 4 (2019) - Season 7
- VIVO Pro Kabaddi Champion (2015) - Season 2 (2016) - Season 4 (2025) - Season 12
- Asian games silver medalist (2010, 2014)
- Asian Games Gold medalist (2018)
- First player in PKL history to achieve 500 tackle points.
- Most Valuable Player in PKL Season 12 (2025)
