= Telugu Titans =

Professional kabaddi team based in Visakhapatnam, Andhra Pradesh

- Founded: 2014
- First season: 2014
- Last season: 2024
- Based in: Hyderabad / Visakhapatnam
- Home ground: G. M. C. Balayogi SATS Indoor Stadium (5,000); R. G. Stadium (5,000)
- Colors
- Owner: Veera Sports
- CEO: Ujjwal Ram Trinath
- Head Coach: Krishan Kumar Hooda
- Captain: (India) Vijay Malik
- Playoff berths: 3
- Website: www.telugutitans.in

Telugu Titans is an Indian professional kabaddi team based in Hyderabad, Telangana that plays in the Pro Kabaddi League. Telugu Titans is a franchise of Veera Sports owned by Srinivas Sreeramaneni of Vaya Group, Gautham Nedurumalli of NED Group and Mahesh Kolli of Greenko Group. The team is led by Vijay Malik, with Krishan Kumar Hooda and Ramesh Kumar serving as its coaches. The team plays their home matches at G. M. C. Balayogi SATS Indoor Stadium, Hyderabad.

== Current squad ==
Telugu Titans squad 2025
No	Name	Nat	Position
1	Vijay Malik (c)	(India)	All Rounder
69	Shubham Shinde (vc)	(India)	Defender - Right Corner
4	Manjeet	(India)	Raider
91	Jai Bhagwan	(India)	Raider
9	Ashish Narwal	(India)	Raider
55	Chetan Sahu	(India)	Raider
	Rohit Singh	(India)	Raider
	Nitin Rawal	(India)	Raider
9	Prafull Zaware	(India)	Left Raider
11	Bharat Hooda	(India)	All- Rounder
1	Shankar Gadai	(India)	All-Rounder
	Ganesh Parki	(Nepal)	All-Rounder
12	Ajit Pawar	(India)	Defender - Left Cover
	Sagar Rawal	(India)	Defender - Right Cover
	Avi Duhan	(India)	Defender - Right Cover
2	Ankit	(India)	Defender - Left Corner
	Bantu Malik	(India)	Defender - Left Corner
	Rahul Dagar	(India)	Defender - Left Corner
	Aman Mukesh	(India)	Defender - Left Corner
	Amir Ejlali	(Iran)	Defender - Right Corner
Source:TT Players

== Administration and support staff ==
Position	Name
Owner	(India) Srinivas Sreeramaneni, Gautam Reddy, Mahesh Kolli
CEO	(India) Trinadh Reddy J.
Manager	(India) Merwan.N
Head coach	(India) Krishan Kumar Hooda
Assistant coach	(India) Ramesh Kumar
Physiotherapist	(India) Arjun
Source:TT Staff

== Records ==
Seasons	Total	Wins	Tied	Losses	% Win	Table Position	Result
Season 1	14	6	3	5	53.57%	5	League stage
Season 2	16	9	3	4	65.63%	2	3rd place
Season 3	14	7	0	7	50.00%	5	League stage
Season 4	16	8	2	6	56.25%	2	4th place
Season 5	22	7	3	12	38.64%	5 (B)*	League stage
Season 6	22	8	1	13	38.64%	5 (B)*	League stage
Season 7	22	6	3	13	34.09%	11	League Stage
Season 8	22	1	4	17	4.54%	12	League Stage
Season 9	22	2	0	20	9.09%	12	League Stage
Season 10	22	2	1	19	9.09%	12	League Stage
Season 11	22	12	0	10	54.55%	7	League Stage
Season 12	18	10	-	8	55.56%	4	3rd place

* In seasons 5 and 6, the teams were divided into two zones, with each zone having six teams based on their geographical proximity.

=== By opposition ===
Note: Table lists in alphabetical order.

Opposition	Played	Won	Lost	Drawn	% Win
Bengal Warriors	21	3	13	5	14.3%
Bengaluru Bulls	23	3	16	4	13.0%
Dabang Delhi	17	8	8	1	47.1%
Gujarat Giants	10	1	9	0	10.0%
Haryana Steelers	11	4	6	1	36.4%
Jaipur Pink Panthers	18	8	9	1	44.4%
Patna Pirates	22	10	11	1	45.5%
Puneri Paltan	19	6	12	1	31.6%
Tamil Thalaivas	14	5	8	1	35.7%
U Mumba	17	5	10	2	29.4%
UP Yoddha	14	3	9	2	21.4%
Total	186	56	111	19	30.1%

== Sponsors ==
Year	Season	Kit manufacturer	Main sponsor	Back sponsor	Sleeve sponsor
2014	I	Vats	Nise Gel	Uurmi Systems	Greenko
2015	II	Field Gear	Greenko	Maha Cement	Uurmi Systems
2016	III	Field Gear	Greenko	Maha Cement	Uurmi Systems
2016	IV	Field Gear	Greenko	Stay-on	Star Hospitals
2017	V	Field Gear	Greenko	TVS Tyres	GEM Home Appliances
2018	VI	Vats	Greenko	Haldiram's	Xiaomi
2019	VII	Vats	Greenko	Araku Coffee	Powerzone
2021	VIII	Vats	Indinews	Woods	Truke
2022	IX	Omtex	DafaNews		
2023	X	Pace International	DafaNews	AM Green	Woods
2024	XI	Pace International	Bicycle	AM Green	Vipani
2025	XII				
