= Gujarat Giants (PKL) =

Professional kabaddi team in Gujarat, India

- Full name: Gujarat Giants
- Short name: GG
- Sport: Kabaddi
- Founded: 2017
- First season: 2017
- Last season: 2024
- League: Pro Kabaddi League
- Based in: Ahmedabad, Gujarat, India
- Stadium: EKA Arena by TransStadia
- Colors
- Anthem: Garjega Gujarat
- Owner: Adani Sportsline
- Head coach: Jaivir Sharma
- Captain: Mohammad Reza Shadloui
- Website: gujaratgiants.com

Uniforms
Home	Away

Gujarat Giants, formerly Gujarat Fortune Giants, is a professional Kabaddi team based in Ahmedabad, Gujarat, competing in the Pro Kabaddi League. Owned by the sports arm of the Adani Group, Adani Sportsline, Gujarat Giants joined the league in 2017. The team, currently led by Iranian all-rounder Mohammad Reza Shadloui and coached by Jaivir Sharma and Varinder Singh, plays home matches at The Arena by TransStadia. They made it to the finals in their first two seasons, in 2017 and 2018, finishing as runners-up both times. Despite a strong come-back, they were eliminated in the playoffs of PKL Season X by Haryana Steelers in the Eliminator.

== Team identity ==
=== Logo and mascot ===
The Gujarat Giants' logo depicts a muscular giant in a red dhoti with a tilak on his forehead. This represents the team's values of power, strength, and energy.

=== Anthem ===
The current anthem, Garjega Gujarat, was sung by Daler Mehandi and Gujarati folk singer Aditya Gadhvi.

== Team history ==
=== 2017 ===
Gujarat Giants entered the Pro Kabaddi League in the 2017 season under the name Gujarat Fortune Giants. In the fifth season of the league, the Giants were the first team to qualify with a record of 15 wins in 22 games. They swiftly made their way to the finals of the tournament. However, despite their strong performance, they faced defeat at the hands of Patna Pirates, losing 38-55 in the final. Notable players in their lineup included Fazel Atrachali, a key defender, and Abozar Mighani, their most expensive overseas pick in the auction. Additionally, the team bolstered its roster by adding Sukesh Hegde, further strengthening their lineup.

During their inaugural season, individual performances also stood out for the Giants. Sachin emerged as their top raider, making 132 successful raids in 32 games. Meanwhile, Abozar Mighani led the team in successful tackles with 63 in 24 games. Fazel Atrachali achieved the most High 5s for the Giants, securing four in 24 matches. Sachin's notable performance in Qualifier 1, where he earned 9 points against Bengal Warriors, played a key role in Gujarat Giants reaching the final.

Gujarat Giants Season 5 squad

Name	Position
Fazel Atrachali	Defender
Abozar Mighani	Defender
Sukesh Hegde	Raider
Seong Ryeol Kim	All-rounder
Mahipal Narwal	All-rounder
Mahendra Ganesh Rajput	Raider
C Kalai Arasan	Defender
Rohit Gulia	All-rounder
Vikas Kale	Defender
Manoj Kumar	Defender
Amit Rathi	Raider
Sachin	Raider
Parvesh Bhainswal	Defender
Sunil Kumar	Defender
Sultan Dange	Raider
Pawan Kumar Sehrawat	Raider
Rakesh Narwal	Raider
Chandran Ranjit	Raider

=== 2018 ===
In season 6, Gujarat Giants made Sunil Kumar their captain and decided not to retain Fazel Atrachali. Despite this change, they continued to excel, as they became the first team to qualify for the playoffs with 17 wins out of 22 matches. Once again, they advanced to the finals but faced defeat against Bengaluru in Mumbai. Their journey to the final saw them triumph over the Yoddhas in Qualifier 1.

Sachin carried forward his form from season 5, emerging as the top raider for the Giants with 159 successful raids in 23 games. He also amassed the most raid points for the team, totaling 190 points, and achieved the most Super 10s with 7. Sachin's contributions earned him a total of 204 points, the highest among all Gujarat Giants players that season.

On the defensive front, Parvesh Bhainswal had 82 successful tackles in 25 games - the most by a Gujarat Giants player. Bhainswal also secured 5 High 5s during the season. His tally of 86 tackle points ranked him second-highest across the league.

Gujarat Giants Season 6 squad

Name	Position
Sunil Kumar	Defender
C. Kalai Arasan	Defender
Amit Vikram Kandola	Defender
Parvesh Bhainswal	Defender
Sachin Vittala	Defender
Amit Jaivir Sharma	Defender
Dharmender	Raider
Yashwant Bishnoi	Raider
Shubham Ashok Palkar	Raider
Ajay Kumar	Raider
K. Prapanjan	Raider
Dong Geon Lee	Raider
Lalit Chaudhary	Raider
Mahendra Ganesh Rajput	Raider
Sachin	Raider
Rohit Gulia	All-rounder
Hadi Oshtorak	All-rounder
Anil	All-rounder

=== 2019 ===
In the seventh season of the Pro Kabaddi League, Gujarat Giants led by Sunil Kumar finished in 9th place. Out of the 22 games they played, they managed to secure victory in 7 matches. Their last game of the season saw them defeat the Telugu Titans with a scoreline of 48-38. Despite starting the tournament strong with three consecutive wins, they faced a setback by losing six games in a row thereafter. This inconsistency led to them missing out on the playoffs for the first time since their entry into the PKL.

Rohit Gulia emerged as the top raider for the Gujarat Giants, accumulating 132 raid points across 22 games. He also notched up the most Super 10s for the team, achieving this feat four times during the season. Meanwhile, Sunil Kumar secured six super tackles in 18 games, highlighting his contribution to the team's defensive strategy.

Gujarat Giants Season 7 squad

Name	Position
Sachin Tanwar	Raider
Sunil Kumar	Defender
Lalit Chaudhary	Raider
Rohit Gulia	All-rounder
Parvesh Bhainswal	Defender
Ruturaj Koravi	Defender
Vinod Kumar	All-rounder
Abolfazl Maghsoudloumahali	Raider
Gurvinder Singh	Raider
Sonu Gahlawat	Defender
GB More	Raider
Sonu	Raider
Abhishek	Raider
Pankaj	All-Rounder
Amit	Defender
Mohammad Shazid Hossain	All-rounder

=== 2021-22 ===
The 8th season of the Pro Kabaddi League faced a delay due to the COVID-19 pandemic, eventually starting in December 2021. For Gujarat Giants it was a season of redemption after their absence from the playoffs in 2019. They made a strong comeback, winning 10 out of 22 games to secure a playoff spot. However, their journey in the playoffs was cut short after defeat by Bengaluru Bulls in the Eliminator 2.

Despite missing key players like Rohit Gulia and Sachin Tanwar, the Giants managed to maintain a competitive edge by retaining Parvesh Bhainswal and Sunil Kumar from the previous season. Bhainswal emerged as a standout performer, leading the team in tackle points with 56 in 23 games and recording the most super ackles (10). Additionally, Girish Maruti Ernak, brought in during the auction ahead of the season, showcased his defense, securing the most high 5s for the Giants, totaling 4 throughout the season.

Gujarat Giants Season 8 squad

Name	Position
Harmanjit Singh	Raider
Sonu	Raider
Sonu Singh	Raider
Rathan K	Raider
Maninder Singh	Raider
Harshit Yadav	Raider
Pardeep Kumar	Raider
Ajay Kumar	Raider
Gaurav Chhikara	Raider
Rakesh	Raider
Sohit	Raider
Mahendra Rajput	Raider
Soleiman Pahlevani	Defender
Parvesh Bhainswal	Defender
Ankit	Defender
Sunil Kumar	Defender
Sumit	Defender
Girish Ernak	Defender
Ravinder Pahal	Defender
Hadi Oshtorak	All-rounder

=== 2022-23 ===
Ahead of the 9th season of the Pro Kabaddi League, Gujarat Giants made strategic moves by replacing Manpreet Singh with Ram Mehar Singh as their coach. Ram Mehar Singh had earlier guided the Patna to victory in season 5, and brought valuable experience to the team. Additionally, Ram Mehar Singh's recognition as an Arjuna recipient for his gold-medal-winning performances at the Asian Games added further credibility to his coaching skills. Chandran Ranjit was entrusted with the captaincy.

The Giants commenced their season with a draw against the Thalaivas. During the Bengaluru leg, they secured 3 wins but also faced 3 losses. However, their campaign hit a snag when captain Chandran sustained an injury, resulting in Dong Geon Lee stepping in as the stand-in captain. Despite this setback, the team persevered, albeit facing a challenging final leg where they suffered 4 consecutive losses. However, they finished the season on a positive note, clinching 4 wins and a draw in their last 5 matches. Ultimately, they secured the 8th position in the points table with 9 wins out of 22 games.

Parteek Dahiya emerged as the top scorer for the Giants, amassing an impressive total of 183 points. Rakesh contributed significantly with 131 points before his injury sidelined him. Despite his injury, Chandran Ranjit managed to rack up 95 raid points. Notably, the Giants had the best raid percentage (44.92%) in the tournament. On the defensive front, Rinku Narwal had 38 tackle points.

Gujarat Giants Season 9 squad

Name	Position
Dong Geon Lee	Raider
Chandran Ranjit	Raider
Pardeep Kumar	Raider
Rakesh	Raider
Mahendra Ganesh Rajput	Raider
Purna Singh	Raider
Sawin	Raider
Sonu	Raider
Gaurav Chhikara	Raider
Parteek Dahiya	Raider
Sohit	Raider
Sonu Singh	Raider
Rinku Narwal	Defender
Sandeep Kandola	Defender
Young Chang Ko	Defender
Baldev Singh	Defender
Ujjval Singh	Defender
Sourav Gulia	Defender
Manuj Vinod Kumar	Defender
Shankar Bhimraj	All-rounder
Arkam Shaikh	All-rounder
Gadai Rohan Singh	All-rounder

=== 2023-24 ===
The Gujarat Giants approached the season with a mix of retained and a number of high-profile picks at the auction. Having retained core players like Manuj, Sonu Jaglan, Rakesh Sungroya, Rohan Singh, and Parteek Dahiya, they bolstered the squad by acquiring defender Fazel Atrachali, a former Giant himself, for a significant amount of 1.80 crore. They re-signed players like Arkam Shaikh and Rohit Gulia, along with adding new talents such as Mohammad Esmaeil Nabibakhsh, Sombir, Deepak Singh, Balaji D., Vikas Jaglan, and Sourav Gulia.

The Giants started their season on a promising note, securing three consecutive victories. However, they encountered a rough patch with three consecutive losses. They staged a comeback by winning their next three matches. Despite facing intermittent setbacks, including two losses in subsequent three games, they maintained focus towards the end of the season. Performance in the latter stages helped them reach the playoffs.

In terms of individual performances, Fazel Atrachali made history by becoming the first defender in the league to surpass 450 tackle points. Sombir contributed significantly to the team's defensive efforts, registering 52 tackle points, including eight super tackles and four high 5s. Meanwhile, Deepak Singh had 43 tackle points in 14 games, highlighting his impact despite limited appearances.

On the raiding front, Parteek Dahiya delivered a standout performance by setting a new record for the most raid points in a single game, amassing a total of 22 points against the Warriors. Throughout the season, he accumulated 130 raid points in 20 games, featuring nine super raids and six super 10s, while Sonu and Rakesh Sungroya also made notable contributions.

== Current squad ==
Squad for 2025 Pro Kabaddi League.

Gujarat Giants squad
No.	Name	Nationality	Position
8	Md Reza Shadloui (c)	Iran	All-Rounder
10	Rakesh Sungroya	India	Raider
11	Parteek Dahiya	India	Raider
9	Himanshu Singh	India	Raider
55	V. Ajith Kumar	India	Raider
	Ankit Dahiya	India	Raider
	Harish Kamatchi	India	Raider
	Himanshu Jaglan	India	Right Raider
	Shridhar Kadam	India	Right Raider
	Nitin Panwar	India	All-Rounder
	Himanshu Yadav	India	All-Rounder
	Vishwanath	India	All-Rounder
	Sumit	India	Defender
	Amit Surender	India	Defender
	Lucky Sharma	India	Defender - Right Corner
	Rohit Nandal	India	Defender - Left Cover
	Shubham Kumar	India	Defender - Left Cover
	Milad Jabbari	Iran	Defender - Right Cover

== Seasons ==
=== Season V ===
The teams are divided into two zones with each zone having six teams based on their geographical proximity. Each team will play 15 intra-zonal matches and 7 inter-zonal matches.
Zone A

Team	Pld	W	L	D	SD	Pts
Gujarat Fortune Giants (R)	22	15	4	3	126	87
Puneri Paltan	22	15	7	0	91	80
Haryana Steelers	22	13	5	4	40	79
U Mumba	22	10	12	0	-50	56
Jaipur Pink Panthers	22	8	13	1	-91	51
Dabang Delhi KC	22	5	16	1	-134	29

Zone B

Team	Pld	W	L	D	SD	Pts
Bengal Warriors	22	11	5	6	19	77
Patna Pirates (C)	22	10	7	5	60	71
UP Yoddha	22	8	10	4	2	60
Bengaluru Bulls	22	8	11	3	10	57
Telugu Titans	22	7	12	3	-2	52
Tamil Thalaivas	22	6	14	2	-71	46

Source: ProKabaddi

- advanced to Qualifier 1
- advanced to Eliminators
- Five points for a win
- Three points each for a drawn game
- One point for a loss by 7 points or fewer

=== Season VI ===
The teams are divided into two zones with each zone having six teams based on their geographical proximity. Each team will play 15 intra-zonal matches and 7 inter-zonal matches.
Zone A

Team	Pld	W	L	D	SD	Pts
Gujarat Fortune Giants (R)	22	17	3	2	117	93
U Mumba	22	15	5	2	189	86
Dabang Delhi KC	22	11	9	2	-1	68
Puneri Paltan	22	8	12	2	-45	52
Jaipur Pink Panthers	22	6	13	3	-69	43
Haryana Steelers	22	6	14	2	-91	42

Zone B

Team	Pld	W	L	D	SD	Pts
Bengaluru Bulls (C)	22	13	7	2	104	78
Bengal Warriors	22	12	8	2	2	69
UP Yoddha	22	8	10	4	-45	57
Patna Pirates	22	9	11	2	-36	55
Telugu Titans	22	8	13	1	-55	51
Tamil Thalaivas	22	5	13	4	-70	42

Source: ProKabaddi

- advanced to Qualifier 1
- advanced to Eliminators
- Five points for a win
- Three points each for a drawn game
- One point for a loss by 7 points or fewer
- Top three teams from each zone qualify for the playoffs

=== Season VII ===
Team	Pld	W	L	D	SD	Pts
Dabang Delhi KC (R)	22	15	4	3	66	85
Bengal Warriors (C)	22	14	5	3	71	83
UP Yoddha	22	13	7	2	9	74
U Mumba	22	12	8	2	47	72
Haryana Steelers	22	13	8	1	15	71
Bengaluru Bulls	22	11	10	1	16	64
Jaipur Pink Panthers	22	9	11	2	-13	58
Patna Pirates	22	8	13	1	29	51
Gujarat Forunte Giants	22	7	13	2	18	51
Puneri Paltan	22	7	12	3	-72	48
Telugu Titans	22	6	13	3	-67	45
Tamil Thalaivas	22	4	15	3	-119	37

Source: ProKabaddi

- advanced to Finals
- advanced to Eliminators
- Five points for a win
- Three points each for a drawn game
- One point for a loss by 7 points or fewer
- Top 6 teams qualify for the playoffs

=== Season VIII ===
Pos	Team	Pld	W	L	T	SD	Pts	
1	Patna Pirates (R)	22	16	5	1	120	86	Qualification to semi finals
2	Dabang Delhi (C)	22	12	6	4	-3	75	Qualification to semi finals
3	UP Yoddha	22	10	9	3	33	68	Qualification to eliminators
4	Gujarat Giants	22	10	8	4	2	67	Qualification to eliminators
5	Bengaluru Bulls	22	11	9	2	53	66	Qualification to eliminators
6	Puneri Paltan	22	12	9	1	33	66	Qualification to eliminators
7	Haryana Steelers	22	10	9	3	-28	64	
8	Jaipur Pink Panthers	22	10	10	2	14	63	
9	Bengal Warriors	22	9	10	3	-18	57	
10	U Mumba	22	7	10	5	-34	55	
11	Tamil Thalaivas	22	5	11	6	-42	47	
12	Telugu Titans	22	1	17	4	-130	27	

Updated to match(es) played on 25 February 2022. Source: ProKabaddi
(C) Champion; (R) Runners Up
- Five points for a win
- Three points each for a drawn game
- One point for a loss by 7 points or fewer

=== Season IX ===
Pos	Team	Pld	W	L	T	SD	Pts	
1	Jaipur Pink Panthers (C)	22	15	6	1	174	82	Qualification to semi finals
2	Puneri Paltan (R)	22	14	6	2	66	80	Qualification to semi finals
3	Bengaluru Bulls	22	13	8	1	39	74	Qualification to eliminators
4	UP Yoddha	22	12	8	2	42	71	Qualification to eliminators
5	Tamil Thalaivas	22	10	8	4	5	66	Qualification to eliminators
6	Dabang Delhi	22	10	10	2	17	63	Qualification to eliminators
7	Haryana Steelers	22	10	10	2	16	61	
8	Gujarat Giants	22	9	11	2	-16	59	
9	U Mumba	22	10	12	0	-28	56	
10	Patna Pirates	22	8	11	3	-58	54	
11	Bengal Warriors	22	8	11	3	-12	53	
12	Telugu Titans	22	2	20	0	-245	15	

Source: ProKabaddi
(C) Champion; (R) Runners Up
- 5 points for a win
- 3 points for a tied game
- 1 point for a loss by 7 points or fewer

=== Season X ===
Pos	Team	Pld	W	L	T	SD	Pts	
1	Puneri Paltan (C)	22	17	2	3	253	96	Qualification to semi finals
2	Jaipur Pink Panthers	22	16	3	3	141	92	Qualification to semi finals
3	Dabang Delhi	22	13	6	3	53	79	Qualification to eliminators
4	Gujarat Giants	22	13	9	0	32	70	Qualification to eliminators
5	Haryana Steelers (R)	22	13	8	1	-13	70	Qualification to eliminators
6	Patna Pirates	22	11	8	3	50	69	Qualification to eliminators
7	Bengal Warriors	22	9	11	2	-43	55	
8	Bengaluru Bulls	22	8	12	2	-67	53	
9	Tamil Thalaivas	22	9	13	0	32	51	
10	U Mumba	22	6	13	3	-79	45	
11	UP Yoddhas	22	4	17	1	-116	31	
12	Telugu Titans	22	2	19	1	-243	21	

Source: ProKabaddi
Rules for classification:
- 5 points for a win
- 3 points for a tied game
- 1 point for a loss by 7 points or fewer
(C) Champion; (R) Runners Up

== Records ==
Seasons	Total	Wins	Tied	Losses	Position
Season 5	24	16	3	5	1
Season 6	25	18	2	5	1
Season 7	22	7	2	13	8
Season 8	22	10	8	4	4
Season 9	22	9	2	11	8
Season 10	22	13	0	9	4

=== By opposition ===
Note: Table lists in alphabetical order.

Opposition	Played	Won	Lost	Drawn	% Win
Bengal Warriors	13	7	4	2	53.8%
Bengaluru Bulls	15	8	5	2	53.3%
Dabang Delhi	15	6	6	3	40.0%
Haryana Steelers	17	4	12	1	23.5%
Jaipur Pink Panthers	16	6	8	2	37.5%
Patna Pirates	15	6	8	1	40.0%
Puneri Paltan	16	8	7	1	50.0%
Tamil Thalaivas	12	6	5	1	50.0%
Telugu Titans	12	10	2	0	83.3%
U Mumba	16	10	5	1	62.5%
UP Yoddhas	13	7	4	2	53.8%
Total	160	78	66	16	48.7%

== Sponsors ==
Year	Season	Kit manufacturer	Main sponsor	Back sponsor	Sleeve sponsor
2017	V	Shiv-Naresh	Adani	Simpolo	Fogg
2018	VI	Shiv-Naresh	Fru2go	Johnson Tiles	Adani
2019	VII	Shiv-Naresh	Finolex	Fortune	Adani
2021	VIII	Shiv-Naresh	WinZO	Astral	Adani
2022	IX	Shiv-Naresh	1xBat	Ambuja Cements	Adani
2023	X	Shiv-Naresh	ACC	Fortune	Adani
2024	XI	Shiv-Naresh	ACC	Fortune	Adani
2025	XII	Shiv-Naresh	ACC	Fortune	InCred
