= Arjun Deshwal =

Indian kabaddi player

Personal information
- Nickname: Raid Machine
- Nationality: Indian
- Born: 7 July 1999 (age 27)
- Years active: 2019-present
- Employer: DSP in UP Police (Sports)

Sport
- Country: India
- Sport: Kabaddi
- League: Pro Kabaddi League
- Team: Tamil Thalaivas (2025-present)
Medal record
Men's Kabaddi
Representing India
Asian Games
Gold medal – first place	2022 Hangzhou	Team
Gold medal – first place	2026 Aichi–Nagoya	Team
Asian Kabaddi Championship
Gold medal – first place	2023 Busan	Team

Arjun Deshwal (born 7 July 1999) is an Indian professional Kabaddi player from Uttar Pradesh. He plays as raider and also he leads Tamil Thalaivas in the Pro Kabaddi League (PKL). He is known as a "Raid Machine" in the league for his aggressive raiding technique. He was part of the Indian team that won the gold medal at the 2022 Asian Games and 2026 Asian Games.

== Early life and background ==
Deshwal was born in Jat family in Basera, Muzaffarnagar district, Uttar Pradesh. He used to watch boys play kabaddi in his village and he too started playing kabaddi regularly by the age of 14. Then he represented his school in the under-16 School Nationals and later in 2019, he was selected for the Uttrakhand State team.

== Career ==
Deshwal began his professional career playing for U Mumba, then he was transferred to the Jaipur Pink Panthers, where he helped win the 2022 PKL Season 9. He is considered one of the top raiders in PKL season 9. In 2023, he competed for India at the 2022 Asian Games; the team won gold, controversially defeating Iran 33–29 in the finals. In domestic tournaments, he represents Services team and Green Army.
