= Haryana Steelers =

Professional Indian kabaddi team

- Full name: Haryana Steelers
- Short name: HAR
- Sport: Kabaddi
- Founded: 2017
- First season: 2017
- Last season: 2024
- League: Pro Kabaddi League
- Location: Panchkula, Haryana
- Stadium: Tau Devi Lal Athletic Stadium
- Colors
- Owner: JSW Sports
- Head coach: Manpreet Singh
- Captain: Jaideep Dahiya
- League titles: 1
- Playoff berths: 4
- Website: Haryana Steelers

Haryana Steelers is a professional kabaddi team based in Haryana that plays in the Pro Kabaddi League. The team is currently led by Jaideep Dahiya. and coached by Manpreet Singh and the assistant coach Neer Gulia. It is owned by JSW Sports, of the JSW Group. The home matches are played at Tau Devi Lal Athletic Stadium.

The Steelers had a good start to life in the PKL as they reached the playoffs in their debut 2017 season.

In Season 10, Haryana Steelers reached the final for the first time in their history but fell short by just a few points. They went on to clinch their maiden Pro Kabaddi League title in Season 11, marking a historic achievement for the franchise.

== Ownership ==
Haryana Steelers is owned by JSW Sports which also owns Hockey India League team Soorma Hockey Club, Indian Premier League team Delhi Capitals, Indian Super League team Bengaluru FC, SA20 team Pretoria Capitals, and ILT20 team Dubai Capitals.

== Squad ==
Haryana Steelers squad
No	Name	Nat	Position
5	Jaideep Dahiya (c)	(India)	Defender - Left Cover
7	Rahul Sethpal (vc)	(India)	Defender - Right Corner
10	Naveen Kumar	(India)	Raider
3	Vinay Tevathia	(India)	Raider
44	Mayank Saini	(India)	Raider
16	Shivam Patare	(India)	Left Raider
	Jayasoorya NS	(India)	Left Raider
	Vishal Tate	(India)	Right Raider
	Vikas Jadhav	(India)	Right Raider
22	Ghanshyam Magar	(Nepal)	Raider
	Shahan Mohammed	(Bangladesh)	Right Raider
	Ankit Dhull	(India)	Defender - Right Corner
	Hardeep Ranbir	(India)	Defender - Left Corner
	Rahul Ahri	(India)	Defender - Left Corner
	Sachin Dahiya	(India)	Defender - Right Cover
	N Manikandan	(India)	Defender - Right Cover
	Zubair Malik	(India)	Defender - Right Cover
	Ritik Radheyshyam	(India)	Defender - Left Cover
	Ashish Narwal	(India)	All-Rounder
	Sahil Narwal	(India)	All-Rounder
Source: Pro Kabaddi

== Identity ==
The logo is an image of a Bhima wielding his Gada (mace), leaning forward with his arm reaching out.

== Seasons ==
=== Season V ===
The teams are divided into two zones with each zone having six teams based on their geographical proximity. Each team will play 15 intra-zonal matches and 7 inter-zonal matches.
Zone A

Team	Pld	W	L	D	SD	Pts
Gujarat Fortune Giants (R)	22	15	4	3	126	87
Puneri Paltan	22	15	7	0	91	80
Haryana Steelers	22	13	5	4	40	79
U Mumba	22	10	12	0	-50	56
Jaipur Pink Panthers	22	8	13	1	-91	51
Dabang Delhi KC	22	5	16	1	-134	29

Zone B

Team	Pld	W	L	D	SD	Pts
Bengal Warriors	22	11	5	6	19	77
Patna Pirates (C)	22	10	7	5	60	71
UP Yoddha	22	8	10	4	2	60
Bengaluru Bulls	22	8	11	3	10	57
Telugu Titans	22	7	12	3	-2	52
Tamil Thalaivas	22	6	14	2	-71	46

Source: ProKabaddi

- advanced to Qualifier 1
- advanced to Eliminators
- Five (5) points for a win
- Three (3) points each for a drawn game
- One (1) point for a loss by 7 points or fewer

=== Season VI ===
The teams are divided into two zones with each zone having six teams based on their geographical proximity. Each team will play 15 intra-zonal matches and 7 inter-zonal matches.
Zone A

Team	Pld	W	L	D	SD	Pts
Gujarat Fortune Giants (R)	22	17	3	2	117	93
U Mumba	22	15	5	2	189	86
Dabang Delhi KC	22	11	9	2	-1	68
Puneri Paltan	22	8	12	2	-45	52
Jaipur Pink Panthers	22	6	13	3	-69	43
Haryana Steelers	22	6	14	2	-91	42

Zone B

Team	Pld	W	L	D	SD	Pts
Bengaluru Bulls (C)	22	13	7	2	104	78
Bengal Warriors	22	12	8	2	2	69
UP Yoddha	22	8	10	4	-45	57
Patna Pirates	22	9	11	2	-36	55
Telugu Titans	22	8	13	1	-55	51
Tamil Thalaivas	22	5	13	4	-70	42

Source: ProKabaddi

- advanced to Qualifier 1
- advanced to Eliminators
- Five (5) points for a win
- Three (3) points each for a drawn game
- One (1) point for a loss by 7 points or fewer
- Top three teams from each zone qualify for the playoffs

=== Season VII ===
Team	Pld	W	L	D	SD	Pts
Dabang Delhi KC (R)	22	15	4	3	66	85
Bengal Warriors (C)	22	14	5	3	71	83
UP Yoddha	22	13	7	2	9	74
U Mumba	22	12	8	2	47	72
Haryana Steelers	22	13	8	1	15	71
Bengaluru Bulls	22	11	10	1	16	64
Jaipur Pink Panthers	22	9	11	2	-13	58
Patna Pirates	22	8	13	1	29	51
Gujarat Forunte Giants	22	7	13	2	18	51
Puneri Paltan	22	7	12	3	-72	48
Telugu Titans	22	6	13	3	-67	45
Tamil Thalaivas	22	4	15	3	-119	37

Source: ProKabaddi

- advanced to Finals
- advanced to Eliminators
- Five (5) points for a win
- Three (3) points each for a drawn game
- One (1) point for a loss by 7 points or fewer
- Top 6 teams qualify for the playoffs

=== Season VIII ===
Pos	Team	Pld	W	L	T	SD	Pts	
1	Patna Pirates (R)	22	16	5	1	120	86	Qualification to semi finals
2	Dabang Delhi (C)	22	12	6	4	-3	75	Qualification to semi finals
3	UP Yoddha	22	10	9	3	33	68	Qualification to eliminators
4	Gujarat Giants	22	10	8	4	2	67	Qualification to eliminators
5	Bengaluru Bulls	22	11	9	2	53	66	Qualification to eliminators
6	Puneri Paltan	22	12	9	1	33	66	Qualification to eliminators
7	Haryana Steelers	22	10	9	3	-28	64	
8	Jaipur Pink Panthers	22	10	10	2	14	63	
9	Bengal Warriors	22	9	10	3	-18	57	
10	U Mumba	22	7	10	5	-34	55	
11	Tamil Thalaivas	22	5	11	6	-42	47	
12	Telugu Titans	22	1	17	4	-130	27	

Updated to match(es) played on 25 February 2022. Source: ProKabaddi
(C) Champion; (R) Runners Up
- Five (5) points for a win
- Three (3) points each for a drawn game
- One (1) point for a loss by 7 points or fewer

=== Season IX ===
Pos	Team	Pld	W	L	T	SD	Pts	
1	Jaipur Pink Panthers (C)	22	15	6	1	174	82	Qualification to semi finals
2	Puneri Paltan (R)	22	14	6	2	66	80	Qualification to semi finals
3	Bengaluru Bulls	22	13	8	1	39	74	Qualification to eliminators
4	UP Yoddha	22	12	8	2	42	71	Qualification to eliminators
5	Tamil Thalaivas	22	10	8	4	5	66	Qualification to eliminators
6	Dabang Delhi	22	10	10	2	17	63	Qualification to eliminators
7	Haryana Steelers	22	10	10	2	16	61	
8	Gujarat Giants	22	9	11	2	-16	59	
9	U Mumba	22	10	12	0	-28	56	
10	Patna Pirates	22	8	11	3	-58	54	
11	Bengal Warriors	22	8	11	3	-12	53	
12	Telugu Titans	22	2	20	0	-245	15	

Source: ProKabaddi
(C) Champion; (R) Runners Up
- 5 points for a win
- 3 points for a tied game
- 1 point for a loss by 7 points or fewer

=== Season X ===
Pos	Team	Pld	W	L	T	SD	Pts	
1	Puneri Paltan (C)	22	17	2	3	253	96	Qualification to semi finals
2	Jaipur Pink Panthers	22	16	3	3	141	92	Qualification to semi finals
3	Dabang Delhi	22	13	6	3	53	79	Qualification to eliminators
4	Gujarat Giants	22	13	9	0	32	70	Qualification to eliminators
5	Haryana Steelers (R)	22	13	8	1	-13	70	Qualification to eliminators
6	Patna Pirates	22	11	8	3	50	69	Qualification to eliminators
7	Bengal Warriors	22	9	11	2	-43	55	
8	Bengaluru Bulls	22	8	12	2	-67	53	
9	Tamil Thalaivas	22	9	13	0	32	51	
10	U Mumba	22	6	13	3	-79	45	
11	UP Yoddhas	22	4	17	1	-116	31	
12	Telugu Titans	22	2	19	1	-243	21	

Source: ProKabaddi
Rules for classification:
- 5 points for a win
- 3 points for a tied game
- 1 point for a loss by 7 points or fewer
(C) Champion; (R) Runners Up

=== Season XI ===
Pos	Team	Pld	W	L	T	SD	Pts	
1	Haryana Steelers (C)	22	16	6	0	112	84	Qualification to semi finals
2	Dabang Delhi	22	13	5	4	85	81	Qualification to semi finals
3	UP Yoddhas	22	13	6	3	97	79	Qualification to eliminators
4	Patna Pirates (R)	22	13	7	2	93	77	Qualification to eliminators
5	U Mumba	22	12	8	2	16	71	Qualification to eliminators
6	Jaipur Pink Panthers	22	12	8	2	55	70	Qualification to eliminators
7	Telugu Titans	22	12	10	0	-40	66	
8	Puneri Paltan	22	9	10	3	61	60	
9	Tamil Thalaivas	22	8	13	1	16	50	
10	Bengal Warriorz	22	5	14	3	-116	41	
11	Gujarat Giants	22	5	14	3	-152	38	
12	Bengaluru Bulls	22	2	19	1	-227	19	

Source: ProKabaddi
Rules for classification:
- 5 points for a win
- 3 points for a tied game
- 1 point for a loss by 7 points or fewer
(C) Champion; (R) Runners up

== Records ==
[*] Drawn matches are considered as half win half loss

Season	Coach	Played	Wins	Losses	Drawn*	League Table Position	Performance
PKL 5	Rambir Singh Khokhar	23	13	6	4	3	Playoffs
PKL 6	Rambir Singh Khokhar	22	6	14	2	6	League Stage
PKL 7	Rakesh Kumar	23	13	9	1	5	Playoffs
PKL 8	Rakesh Kumar	22	10	9	3	7	League Stage
PKL 9	Manpreet Singh	22	10	10	2	7	League Stage
PKL 10	Manpreet Singh	25	15	9	1	5	Runners-up
PKL 11	Manpreet Singh	24	18	6	0	1	Champions

=== By opposition ===
Note: Table lists in alphabetical order.

Opposition	Played	Won	Lost	Drawn	% Win
Bengal Warriors	12	9	3	0	75.0%
Bengaluru Bulls	12	6	6	0	50.0%
Dabang Delhi	15	9	6	0	60.0%
Gujarat Giants	17	12	4	1	70.5%
Jaipur Pink Panthers	17	6	9	2	35.2%
Patna Pirates	13	7	5	1	53.8%
Puneri Paltan	17	6	10	1	35.2%
Tamil Thalaivas	13	8	2	3	61.5%
Telugu Titans	13	7	5	1	53.8%
U Mumba	16	7	7	2	43.7%
UP Yoddha	11	5	4	2	45.4%
Total	156	82	61	13	52.5%

== Sponsors ==
Year	Season	Kit manufacturer	Main sponsor	Back sponsor	Sleeve sponsor
2017	V	4U Sports	Kent RO	Dynex Batteries	Valvoline
2018	VI	Alcis Sports	Herbalife Nutrition	Borosil	Xiaomi
2019	VII	T10 Sports	APL Apollo	Borosil	DafaNews
2021	VIII	T10 Sports	DafaNews	Borosil	Zebpay
2022	IX	Shiv-Naresh	JSW	Borosil	Vision11
2023	X	Puma	JSW	8 PM Premium Black	HPL
2024	XI	Puma	JSW	8 PM Premium Black	HPL
2025	XII	Puma	JSW	8 PM Premium Black	HPL
