= 2021–22 Pro Kabaddi League =

8th Season of Pro Kabaddi League

Vivo Pro Kabaddi 2021 Season 8
- Le panga

Tournament information
- Dates: 22 December 2021–25 February 2022
- Administrator: Mashal Sports
- Tournament format(s): Double round robin and playoffs
- Host: India
- Teams: 12
- Website: prokabaddi.com

Final positions
- Champion: Dabang Delhi (1st title)
- Runner-up: Patna Pirates

Tournament statistics
- Matches played: 137
- Top scorer: (India) Pawan Sehrawat (304) (Bengaluru Bulls)
- Most tackle points: (Iran) Mohammadreza Chiyaneh (89) (Patna Pirates)
- Most successful raid: (India) Pawan Sehrawat (244) (Bengaluru Bulls)
- Most successful tackle: (Iran) Mohammadreza Chiyaneh (86) (Patna Pirates)

The 2021–22 Vivo Pro Kabaddi League was the eighth season of Pro Kabaddi League. The season began on 22 December 2021. The usual travelling caravan format was changed to a single venue hosting all the matches of the season due to spread of COVID-19 pandemic in India. Kanteerava Indoor Stadium, Bangalore was initially announced as the venue, but was later changed to the Sheraton Grand Hotel and Convention Center located in Whitefield, Bangalore.

Each team played against all the other teams twice, and the top 6 teams proceed to the play-offs. The player auctions for the season 8 were conducted from 29 to 31 August 2021 in Mumbai. Dabang Delhi defeated Patna Pirates in the final match to win their maiden title

== Teams ==
Locations of the Pro Kabaddi teams

=== Personnel and sponsorships ===
Note: Table lists in alphabetical order.

Teams	Owners	Captain	Head coach	Kit Manufacturer	Main Kit Sponsor	Associate Sponsor
Bengal Warriors	Kishore Biyani	(India) Maninder Singh	(India) BC Ramesh	Spunk	WinZO	Big Bazaar
Bengaluru Bulls	Badri Narayan Choudhary Kota; Ananda Giri	(India) Pawan Kumar Sehrawat	(India) Randhir Singh Sherahawat	TYKA	1xNews	Breathing Room
Dabang Delhi KC	Radha Kapoor	(India) Joginder Narwal	(India) Krishan Kumar Hooda	Shiv-Naresh	JK Super Cement	Vision11
Gujarat Giants	Gautam Adani	(India) Sunil Kumar	(India) Manpreet Singh	Shiv-Naresh	WinZO	Astral
Haryana Steelers	Parth Jindal	(India) Vikash Khandola	(India) Rakesh Kumar	T10 Sports	DafaNews	Borosil
Jaipur Pink Panthers	Abhishek Bachchan	(India) Sandeep Dhull	(India) Sanjeev Kumar Baliyan	TYKA	Indinews	MyFab11
Patna Pirates	Rajesh V. Shah	(India) Prashanth Kumar Rai	(India) Ram Mehar Singh	Pace International	DafaNews	WinZO
Puneri Paltan	Rajesh Harkishandas Doshi; Sumanlal Babulal Shah; Nallepilly Ramaswami Subramanian	(India) Nitin Tomar	(India) Anup Kumar	Shiv-Naresh	Indigo Paints	Schaeffler
Tamil Thalaivas	Nimmagadda Prasad; Sachin Tendulkar; Allu Arjun; Ram Charan; Ritik Chauhan	(India) Surjeet Singh Narwal	(India) Udaya Kumar	Trak Only	Parimatch News	Iodex
Telugu Titans	Srinivas Sreeramaneni; Goutham Reddy Nedurmalli; Mahesh Kolli	(India) Surinder Singh	(India) Jagadish Kumble	Vats	Indinews	Woods
U Mumba	Ronnie Screwvala	(Iran) Fazel Atrachali	(India) Rajaguru Subramanian	Puma	Sansui	Macho Hint
UP Yoddha	Kiran Kumar Grandhi	(India) Nitesh Kumar	(India) Jasveer Singh	Sqad Gear	ABP News	Iodex

=== Foreign players ===
Each team can sign maximum 3 foreign players in the squad.

Teams	Player 1	POS	Player 2	POS	Player 3	POS
Bengal Warriors	(Iran) Mohammad Esmaeil Nabibakhsh	AR	(Iran) Abozar Mohajermighani	DF		
Bengaluru Bulls	(Iran) Abolfazl Maghsodloumahali	RD	(South Korea) Dong Geon Lee	RD		
Dabang Delhi	(Iran) Emad Sedaghatnia	RD	(Iran) Mohammad Malak	DF		
Gujarat Giants	(Iran) Hadi Oshtorak	AR	(Iran) Soleiman Pahlevani	DF		
Haryana Steelers	(Iran) Mohammad Mahalli	RD	(Iran) Hamid Nader	AR		
Jaipur Pink Panthers	(Iran) Amirhossein Mohammad Maleki	RD	(Iran) Mohammad Nosrati	RD		
Patna Pirates	(Iran) Mohammadreza Chiyaneh	DF	(Kenya) Daniel Odhiambo	AR		
Puneri Paltan	(Iran) Hadi Tajik	DF	(Kenya) Victor Obiero	AR		
Tamil Thalaivas	(Sri Lanka) Asiri Alawathge	RD	(Bangladesh) Anwar Baba	AR		
Telugu Titans	(South Korea) Hyunsu Park	RD	(Japan) Abe Tetsuro	DF		
U Mumba	(Iran) Fazel Atrachali	DF	(Iran) Mohsen Maghsoudlou Jafari	AR		
UP Yoddha	(Iran) Mohammad Taghi Paein Mahali	RD	(Kenya) James Kamweti	RD		

== Sponsorship ==
Title Sponsor

- Vivo

Associate Sponsors

- Tata Motors
- Dream11
- MFine
- A23
- BYJU'S
- Mutual Funds

Partners

- Parimatch News
- Officer's Choice
- Dhani
- UltraTech Cement

Broadcast Sponsor

- Star Sports

Digital Streaming Partner

- Disney+ Hotstar

== Viewership ==
This year PKL was played without an audience and shed the caravan style format. Instead, all teams played at a single location in Bengaluru. Looking back at IPL last year, media planners suggest that format changes will have little to no impact on the viewership of the tournament. Mashal Sports has also announced that triple headers will be played on all Saturdays which may have a positive impact on the viewership over weekends.

== Points table ==
Pos	Team	Pld	W	L	T	SD	Pts	
1	Patna Pirates (R)	22	16	5	1	120	86	Qualification to semi finals
2	Dabang Delhi (C)	22	12	6	4	-3	75	Qualification to semi finals
3	UP Yoddha	22	10	9	3	33	68	Qualification to eliminators
4	Gujarat Giants	22	10	8	4	2	67	Qualification to eliminators
5	Bengaluru Bulls	22	11	9	2	53	66	Qualification to eliminators
6	Puneri Paltan	22	12	9	1	33	66	Qualification to eliminators
7	Haryana Steelers	22	10	9	3	-28	64	
8	Jaipur Pink Panthers	22	10	10	2	14	63	
9	Bengal Warriors	22	9	10	3	-18	57	
10	U Mumba	22	7	10	5	-34	55	
11	Tamil Thalaivas	22	5	11	6	-42	47	
12	Telugu Titans	22	1	17	4	-130	27	

Updated to match(es) played on 25 February 2022. Source: ProKabaddi
(C) Champion; (R) Runners Up
- Five (5) points for a win
- Three (3) points each for a drawn game
- One (1) point for a loss by 7 points or fewer

== League stage ==
Match 1
22 December 2021
19:30 (IST)

Bengaluru Bulls	30 – 46	U Mumba
Chandran Ranjit (13)	Report	Abhishek Singh (19)

U Mumba won

Match 2
22 December 2021
20:30 (IST)

Telugu Titans	40 – 40	Tamil Thalaivas
Siddharth Sirish Desai (11)	Report	Manjeet (12)

Match drawn

Match 3
22 December 2021
21:30 (IST)

Bengal Warriors	38 – 33	UP Yoddha
Mohammad Esmaeil Nabibakhsh (8)	Report	Pardeep Narwal (8)

Bengal Warriors won

Match 4
23 December 2021
19:30 (IST)

Gujarat Giants	34 – 27	Jaipur Pink Panthers
Rakesh Narwal (7)	Report	Arjun Deshwal (10)

Gujarat Giants won

Match 5
23 December 2021
20:30 (IST)

Dabang Delhi	41 – 30	Puneri Paltan
Naveen Kumar (16)	Report	Nitin Tomar (7)

Dabang Delhi won

Match 6
23 December 2021
21:30 (IST)

Haryana Steelers	39 – 42	Patna Pirates
Rohit Gulia (10)	Report	Monu Goyat (15)

Patna Pirates won

Match 7
24 December 2021
19:30 (IST)

U Mumba	27 – 31	Dabang Delhi
V. Ajith Kumar (7)	Report	Naveen Kumar (17)

Dabang Delhi won

Match 8
24 December 2021
20:30 (IST)

Tamil Thalaivas	30 – 38	Bengaluru Bulls
Bhavani Rajput (8)	Report	Pawan Sehrawat (9)

Bengaluru Bulls won

Match 9
24 December 2021
21:30 (IST)

Bengal Warriors	31 – 28	Gujarat Giants
Maninder Singh (8)	Report	Rakesh Narwal (12)

Bengal Warriors won

Match 10
25 December 2021
19:30 (IST)

Patna Pirates	35 – 36	UP Yoddha
Sachin (10)	Report	Pardeep Narwal (12)

UP Yoddha won

Match 11
25 December 2021
20:30 (IST)

Puneri Paltan	34 – 33	Telugu Titans
Mohit Goyat (9)	Report	Siddharth Sirish Desai (15)

Puneri Paltan won

Match 12
25 December 2021
21:30 (IST)

Jaipur Pink Panthers	40 – 38	Haryana Steelers
Arjun Deshwal (18)	Report	Vikash Khandola (14)

Jaipur Pink Panthers won

Match 13
26 December 2021
19:30 (IST)

Gujarat Giants	24 – 24	Dabang Delhi
Rakesh Narwal (9)	Report	Naveen Kumar (11)

Match drawn

Match 14
26 December 2021
20:30 (IST)

Bengaluru Bulls	36 – 35	Bengal Warriors
Pawan Sehrawat (15)	Report	Maninder Singh (17)

Bengaluru Bulls won

Match 15
27 December 2021
19:30 (IST)

Tamil Thalaivas	30 – 30	U Mumba
Manjeet (8)	Report	Ajith Kumar (15)

Match drawn

Match 16
27 December 2021
20:30 (IST)

UP Yoddha	29 – 32	Jaipur Pink Panthers
Surender Gill (10)	Report	Arjun Deshwal (11)

Jaipur Pink Panthers won

Match 17
28 December 2021
19:30 (IST)

Puneri Paltan	26 – 38	Patna Pirates
Mohit Goyat (5)	Report	Sachin (10)

Patna Pirates won

Match 18
28 December 2021
20:30 (IST)

Telugu Titans	37 – 39	Haryana Steelers
Siddharth Sirish Desai (9)	Report	Meetu Mahender (12)

Haryana Steelers won

Match 19
29 December 2021
19:30 (IST)

Dabang Delhi	52 – 35	Bengal Warriors
Naveen Kumar (24)	Report	Maninder Singh (16)

Dabang Delhi won

Match 20
29 December 2021
20:30 (IST)

UP Yoddha	32 – 32	Gujarat Giants
Pardeep Narwal (11)	Report	Rakesh Narwal (13)

Match drawn

Match 21
30 December 2021
19:30 (IST)

Jaipur Pink Panthers	28 – 37	U Mumba
Arjun Deshwal (14)	Report	Ajith Kumar (11)

U Mumba won

Match 22
30 December 2021
20:30 (IST)

Haryana Steelers	28 – 42	Bengaluru Bulls
Vikash Khandola (7)	Report	Pawan Sehrawat (20)

Bengaluru Bulls won

Match 23
31 December 2021
19:30 (IST)

Tamil Thalaivas	36 – 26	Puneri Paltan
Ajinkya Pawar (11)	Report	Pankaj Mohite (7)

Tamil Thalaivas won

Match 24
31 December 2021
20:30 (IST)

Patna Pirates	44 – 30	Bengal Warriors
Monu Goyat (12)	Report	Maninder Singh (12)

Patna Pirates won

Match 25
1 January 2022
19:30 (IST)

U Mumba	28 – 28	UP Yoddha
V. Ajith Kumar (9)	Report	Surender Gill (8)

Match drawn

Match 26
1 January 2022
20:30 (IST)

Bengaluru Bulls	34 – 34	Telugu Titans
Chandran Ranjit (9)	Report	Ankit Beniwal (10)

Match drawn

Match 27
1 January 2022
21:30 (IST)

Dabang Delhi	30 – 30	Tamil Thalaivas
Naveen Kumar (15)	Report	Manjeet (9)

Match drawn

Match 28
2 January 2022
19:30 (IST)

Gujarat Giants	36 – 38	Haryana Steelers
H.S. Rakesh (19)	Report	Vikash Khandola (10)

Haryana Steelers won

Match 29
2 January 2022
20:30 (IST)

Puneri Paltan	29 – 40	Bengaluru Bulls
Aslam Inamdar (6)	Report	Pawan Sehrawat (11)

Bengaluru Bulls won

Match 30
3 January 2022
19:30 (IST)

Bengal Warriors	31 – 28	Jaipur Pink Panthers
Maninder Singh (12)	Report	Arjun Deshwal (16)

Bengal Warriors won

Match 31
3 January 2022
20:30 (IST)

Telugu Titans	30 – 31	Patna Pirates
Ankit Beniwal (10)	Report	Monu Goyat (6)

Patna Pirates won

Match 32
4 January 2022
19:30 (IST)

Haryana Steelers	24 – 24	U Mumba
Rohit Gulia (7)	Report	Abhishek Singh (4)

Match drawn

Match 33
4 January 2022
20:30 (IST)

UP Yoddha	33 – 39	Tamil Thalaivas
Surender Gill (13)	Report	Manjeet (6)

Tamil Thalaivas won

Match 34
5 January 2022
19:30 (IST)

Puneri Paltan	33 – 26	Gujarat Giants
Mohit Goyal (10)	Report	Ajay Kumar (10)

Puneri Paltan won

Match 35
5 January 2022
20:30 (IST)

Dabang Delhi	36 – 35	Telugu Titans
Naveen Kumar (25)	Report	Rajnish (20)

Dabang Delhi won

Match 36
6 January 2022
19:30 (IST)

Patna Pirates	30 – 30	Tamil Thalaivas
Monu Goyat (8)	Report	Ajinkya Pawar (12)

Match drawn

Match 37
6 January 2022
20:30 (IST)

Bengaluru Bulls	38 – 31	Jaipur Pink Panthers
Pawan Sehrawat (17)	Report	Arjun Deshwal (13)

Bengaluru Bulls won

Match 38
7 January 2022
19:30 (IST)

Bengal Warriors	37 – 41	Haryana Steelers
Maninder Singh (14)	Report	Meetu Mahender (10)

Haryana Steelers won

Match 39
7 January 2022
20:30 (IST)

Jaipur Pink Panthers	31 – 26	Puneri Paltan
Arjun Deshwal (11)	Report	Nitin Tomar (4)

Jaipur Pink Panthers won

Match 40
8 January 2022
19:30 (IST)

UP Yoddha	33 – 37	Dabang Delhi
Pardeep Narwal (9)	Report	Naveen Kumar (17)

Dabang Delhi won

Match 41
8 January 2022
20:30 (IST)

U Mumba	48 – 38	Telugu Titans
Abhishek Singh (13)	Report	Galla Raju (8)

U Mumba won

Match 42
8 January 2022
21:30 (IST)

Gujarat Giants	26 – 27	Patna Pirates
Mahendra Ganesh Rajput (7)	Report	Prashanth Kumar Rai (8)

Patna Pirates won

Match 43
9 January 2022
19:30 (IST)

Puneri Paltan	39 – 27	Bengal Warriors
Aslam Inamdar (16)	Report	Maninder Singh (13)

Puneri Paltan won

Match 44
9 January 2022
20:30 (IST)

Bengaluru Bulls	27 – 42	UP Yoddha
Bharat (11)	Report	Shrikant Jadhav (12)

UP Yoddha won

Match 45
10 January 2022
19:30 (IST)

Tamil Thalaivas	45 – 26	Haryana Steelers
Manjeet (10)	Report	Vikash Khandola (8)

Tamil Thalaivas won

Match 46
10 January 2022
20:30 (IST)

Jaipur Pink Panthers	30 – 28	Dabang Delhi
Deepak Niwas Hooda (9)	Report	Naveen Kumar (7)

Jaipur Pink Panthers won

Match 47
11 January 2022
19:30 (IST)

Patna Pirates	43 – 23	U Mumba
Sachin (7)	Report	Abhishek Singh (8)

Patna Pirates won

Match 48
11 January 2022
20:30 (IST)

Telugu Titans	22 – 40	Gujarat Giants
Rajnish (11)	Report	H.S. Rakesh (16)

Gujarat Giants won

Match 49
12 January 2022
19:30 (IST)

Haryana Steelers	36 – 36	UP Yoddha
Vikash Khandola (17)	Report	Surender Gill (13)

Match drawn

Match 50
12 January 2022
20:30 (IST)

Dabang Delhi	22 – 61	Bengaluru Bulls
Ashu Malik (6)	Report	Pawan Sehrawat (27)

Bengaluru Bulls won

Match 51
13 January 2022
19:30 (IST)

Bengal Warriors	37 – 28	Tamil Thalaivas
Maninder Singh (12)	Report	Manjeet (8)

Bengal Warriors won

Match 52
13 January 2022
20:30 (IST)

U Mumba	23 – 42	Puneri Paltan
Abhishek Singh (4)	Report	Aslam Inamdar (6)

Puneri Paltan won

Match 53
14 January 2022
19:30 (IST)

Jaipur Pink Panthers	38 – 28	Patna Pirates
Deepak Niwas Hooda (10)	Report	Monu Goyat (6)

Jaipur Pink Panthers won

Match 54
14 January 2022
20:30 (IST)

Gujarat Giants	37 – 46	Bengaluru Bulls
H.S. Rakesh (14)	Report	Pawan Sehrawat (19)

Bengaluru Bulls won

Match 55
15 January 2022
19:30 (IST)

Haryana Steelers	25 – 28	Dabang Delhi
Meetu Mahender (5)	Report	Vijay Malik (11)

Dabang Delhi won

Match 56
15 January 2022
20:30 (IST)

UP Yoddha	39 – 33	Telugu Titans
Pardeep Narwal (10)	Report	Rajnish (9)

UP Yoddha won

Match 57
15 January 2022
21:30 (IST)

U Mumba	32 – 32	Bengal Warriors
Abhishek Singh (13)	Report	Maninder Singh (17)

Match drawn

Match 58
16 January 2022
19:30 (IST)

Tamil Thalaivas	31 – 31	Jaipur Pink Panthers
Manjeet (9)	Report	Arjun Deshwal (6)

Match drawn

Match 59
16 January 2022
20:30 (IST)

Patna Pirates	38 – 31	Bengaluru Bulls
Sachin (8)	Report	Pawan Sehrawat (10)

Patna Pirates won

Match 60
17 January 2022
19:30 (IST)

Puneri Paltan	40 – 50	UP Yoddha
Aslam Inamdar (16)	Report	Surender Gill (21)

UP Yoddha won

Match 61
17 January 2022
20:30 (IST)

Telugu Titans	27 – 28	Bengal Warriors
Rajnish (11)	Report	Maninder Singh (10)

Bengal Warriors won

Match 62
18 January 2022
19:30 (IST)

Dabang Delhi	32 – 29	Patna Pirates
Vijay Malik (9)	Report	Prashanth Kumar Rai (6)

Dabang Delhi won

Match 63
18 January 2022
20:30 (IST)

Gujarat Giants	24 – 24	U Mumba
Rakesh Narwal (6)	Report	V. Ajith Kumar (8)

Match drawn

Match 64
19 January 2022
19:30 (IST)

Haryana Steelers	37 – 30	Puneri Paltan
Vikash Khandola (8)	Report	S. Vishwas (7)

Haryana Steelers won

Match 65
19 January 2022
20:30 (IST)

Jaipur Pink Panthers	34 – 35	Telugu Titans
Arjun Deshwal (13)	Report	Adarsh T (9)

Telugu Titans won

Match 66
20 January 2022
19:30 (IST)

Tamil Thalaivas	35 – 37	Gujarat Giants
Manjeet (12)	Report	Mahendra Ganesh Rajput (8)

Gujarat Giants won

Match 67
20 January 2022
20:30 (IST)

Bengaluru Bulls	39 – 40	Bengal Warriors
Pawan Sehrawat (13)	Report	Maninder Singh (8)

Bengal Warriors won

Match 68
21 January 2022
19:30 (IST)

Dabang Delhi	33 – 36	Haryana Steelers
Sandeep Narwal (7)	Report	Vikash Khandola (13)

Haryana Steelers won

Match 69
21 January 2022
20:30 (IST)

Bengal Warriors	36 – 40	UP Yoddha
Maninder Singh (19)	Report	Pardeep Narwal (9)

UP Yoddha won

Match 70
22 January 2022
19:30 (IST)

Bengaluru Bulls	35 – 37	Puneri Paltan
Pawan Sehrawat (10)	Report	Mohit Goyat (13)

Puneri Paltan won

Match 71
22 January 2022
20:30 (IST)

U Mumba	42 – 35	Telugu Titans
Abhishek Singh (15)	Report	Adarsh T (12)

U Mumba won

Match 72
22 January 2022
21:30 (IST)

Jaipur Pink Panthers	34 – 34	Tamil Thalaivas
Arjun Deshwal (15)	Report	Ajinkya Pawar (14)

Match drawn

Match 73
23 January 2022
19:30 (IST)

UP Yoddha	35 – 36	Haryana Steelers
Shrikant Jadhav (10)	Report	Rohit Gulia (7)

Haryana Steelers won

Match 74
23 January 2022
20:30 (IST)

Telugu Titans	31 – 36	Bengaluru Bulls
Ankit Beniwal (6)	Report	Pawan Sehrawat (12)

Bengaluru Bulls won

Match 75
24 January 2022
19:30 (IST)

Bengal Warriors	41 – 22	Jaipur Pink Panthers
Maninder Singh (13)	Report	Arjun Deshwal (10)

Bengal Warriors won

Match 76
24 January 2022
20:30 (IST)

Puneri Paltan	42 – 25	Dabang Delhi
Mohit Goyat (9)	Report	Vijay Malik (8)

Puneri Paltan won

Match 77
25 January 2022
19:30 (IST)

Haryana Steelers	39 – 39	Telugu Titans
Vikash Khandola (10)	Report	Ankit Beniwal (10)

Match drawn

Match 78
26 January 2022
19:30 (IST)

U Mumba	45 – 34	Bengaluru Bulls
Abhishek Singh (11)	Report	Pawan Sehrawat (14)

U Mumba won

Match 79
27 January 2022
19:30 (IST)

UP Yoddha	38 – 44	Puneri Paltan
Surender Gill (16)	Report	Mohit Goyat (14)

Puneri Paltan won

Match 80
28 January 2022
19:30 (IST)

Patna Pirates	52 – 24	Tamil Thalaivas
Prashanth Kumar Rai (8)	Report	Ajinkya Pawar (5)

Patna Pirates won

Match 81
29 January 2022
19:30 (IST)

Gujarat Giants	22 – 41	Dabang Delhi
Pardeep Kumar (7)	Report	Vijay Malik (8)

Dabang Delhi won

Match 82
30 January 2022
19:30 (IST)

Patna Pirates	30 – 51	Jaipur Pink Panthers
Guman Singh (11)	Report	Arjun Deshwal (17)

Jaipur Pink Panthers won

Match 83
30 January 2022
20:30 (IST)

Tamil Thalaivas	42 – 24	Bengaluru Bulls
Ajinkya Pawar (10)	Report	Pawan Sehrawat (8)

Tamil Thalaivas won

Match 84
31 January 2022
19:30 (IST)

Haryana Steelers	26 – 32	Gujarat Giants
Meetu Mahender (8)	Report	Ajay Kumar (11)

Gujarat Giants won

Match 85
31 January 2022
20:30 (IST)

Dabang Delhi	36 – 30	U Mumba
Vijay Malik (11)	Report	Abhishek Singh (8)

Dabang Delhi won

Match 86
1 February 2022
19:30 (IST)

Bengal Warriors	25 – 34	Gujarat Giants
Maninder Singh (9)	Report	Ajay Kumar (9)

Gujarat Giants won

Match 87
1 February 2022
20:30 (IST)

Bengaluru Bulls	31 – 26	UP Yoddha
Pawan Sehrawat (9)	Report	Shrikant Jadhav (6)

Bengaluru Bulls won

Match 88
2 February 2022
19:30 (IST)

UP Yoddha	35 – 37	Patna Pirates
Surender Gill (10)	Report	Sachin (12)

Patna Pirates won

Match 89
2 February 2022
20:30 (IST)

Puneri Paltan	36 – 34	U Mumba
Mohit Goyat (9)	Report	V. Ajith Kumar (10)

Puneri Paltan won

Match 90
3 February 2022
19:30 (IST)

Jaipur Pink Panthers	36 – 30	Dabang Delhi
Deepak Niwas Hooda (11)	Report	Vijay Malik (16)

Jaipur Pink Panthers won

Match 91
3 February 2022
20:30 (IST)

Telugu Titans	25 – 43	Tamil Thalaivas
Galla Raju (9)	Report	Ajinkya Pawar (10)

Tamil Thalaivas won

Match 92
4 February 2022
19:30 (IST)

Haryana Steelers	46 – 29	Bengal Warriors
Vikash Khandola (10)	Report	Maninder Singh (13)

Haryana Steelers won

Match 93
4 February 2022
20:30 (IST)

Dabang Delhi	36 – 36	Bengaluru Bulls
Naveen Kumar (13)	Report	Pawan Sehrawat (16)

Match drawn

Match 94
4 February 2022
21:30 (IST)

Gujarat Giants	23 – 43	Patna Pirates
Mahendra Ganesh Rajput (5)	Report	Guman Singh (11)

Patna Pirates won

Match 95
5 February 2022
19:30 (IST)

U Mumba	35 – 33	Tamil Thalaivas
Abhishek Singh (9)	Report	Ajinkya Pawar (7)

U Mumba won

Match 96
5 February 2022
20:30 (IST)

UP Yoddha	39 – 35	Telugu Titans
Surender Gill (12)	Report	Rajnish (11)

UP Yoddha won

Match 97
5 February 2022
21:30 (IST)

Jaipur Pink Panthers	28 – 35	Haryana Steelers
Deepak Niwas Hooda (7)	Report	Vikash Khandola (10)

Haryana Steelers won

Match 98
6 February 2022
19:30 (IST)

Patna Pirates	38 – 29	Bengal Warriors
Sachin (11)	Report	Mohammad Esmaeil Nabibakhsh (8)

Patna Pirates won

Match 99
6 February 2022
20:30 (IST)

Bengaluru Bulls	36 – 40	Gujarat Giants
Pawan Sehrawat (12)	Report	Pardeep Kumar (14)

Gujarat Giants won

Match 100
7 February 2022
19:30 (IST)

Gujarat Giants	31 – 36	Jaipur Pink Panthers
Rakesh Narwal (7)	Report	Deepak Niwas Hooda (10)

Jaipur Pink Panthers won

Match 101
7 February 2022
20:30 (IST)

Bengal Warriors	32 – 32	Telugu Titans
Maninder Singh (11)	Report	Ankit Beniwal (8)

Match drawn

Match 102
8 February 2022
19:30 (IST)

Tamil Thalaivas	29 – 37	Haryana Steelers
Manjeet (8)	Report	Ashish (13)

Haryana Steelers won

Match 103
8 February 2022
20:30 (IST)

U Mumba	36 – 47	Patna Pirates
Abhishek Singh (13)	Report	Sachin (15)

Patna Pirates won

Match 104
9 February 2022
19:30 (IST)

Tamil Thalaivas	39 – 41	UP Yoddha
Manjeet (11)	Report	Surender Gill (13)

UP Yoddha won

Match 105
9 February 2022
20:30 (IST)

Telugu Titans	32 – 34	Gujarat Giants
Rajnish (10)	Report	H.S. Rakesh (8)

Gujarat Giants won

Match 106
10 February 2022
19:30 (IST)

Bengal Warriors	39 – 39	Dabang Delhi
Maninder Singh (16)	Report	Naveen Kumar (16)

Match drawn

Match 107
10 February 2022
20:30 (IST)

Puneri Paltan	26 – 43	Patna Pirates
Aslam Inamdar (9)	Report	Guman Singh (13)

Patna Pirates won

Match 108
11 February 2022
19:30 (IST)

Haryana Steelers	27 – 45	Puneri Paltan
Vinay (6)	Report	Mohit Goyat (10)

Puneri Paltan won

Match 109
11 February 2022
20:30 (IST)

Jaipur Pink Panthers	34 – 41	UP Yoddha
Arjun Deshwal (14)	Report	Pardeep Narwal (14)

UP Yoddha won

Match 110
12 February 2022
19:30 (IST)

Tamil Thalaivas	31 – 32	Dabang Delhi
Manjeet (10)	Report	Naveen Kumar (13)

Dabang Delhi won

Match 111
12 February 2022
20:30 (IST)

U Mumba	37 – 27	Bengal Warriors
V. Ajith Kumar (9)	Report	Maninder Singh (6)

U Mumba won

Match 112
12 February 2022
21:30 (IST)

Telugu Titans	31 – 51	Puneri Paltan
Ankit Beniwal (11)	Report	Mohit Goyat (14)

Puneri Paltan won

Match 113
13 February 2022
19:30 (IST)

Haryana Steelers	37 – 26	U Mumba
Vikash Khandola (13)	Report	Abhishek Singh (9)

Haryana Steelers won

Match 114
13 February 2022
20:30 (IST)

Bengaluru Bulls	45 – 37	Jaipur Pink Panthers
Bharat (15)	Report	Arjun Deshwal (16)

Bengaluru Bulls won

Match 115
13 February 2022
21:30 (IST)

UP Yoddha	31 – 38	Gujarat Giants
Pardeep Narwal (12)	Report	Ajay Kumar (6)

Gujarat Giants won

Match 116
14 February 2022
19:30 (IST)

Patna Pirates	38 – 30	Telugu Titans
Sachin (13)	Report	Rajnish (10)

Patna Pirates won

Match 117
14 February 2022
20:30 (IST)

Dabang Delhi	28 – 44	UP Yoddha
Vijay Malik (8)	Report	Pardeep Narwal (14)

Dabang Delhi won

Match 118
14 February 2022
21:30 (IST)

Gujarat Giants	31 – 31	Puneri Paltan
H.S. Rakesh (10)	Report	Mohit Goyat (10)

Match drawn

Match 119
15 February 2022
19:30 (IST)

U Mumba	28 – 44	Jaipur Pink Panthers
V. Ajith Kumar (11)	Report	Arjun Deshwal (17)

Jaipur Pink Panthers won

Match 120
15 February 2022
20:30 (IST)

Patna Pirates	36 – 34	Bengaluru Bulls
Monu Goyat (9)	Report	Pawan Sehrawat (7)

Patna Pirates won

Match 121
15 February 2022
21:30 (IST)

Puneri Paltan	43 – 31	Tamil Thalaivas
Aslam Inamdar (8)	Report	Himanshu (8)

Puneri Paltan won

Match 122
16 February 2022
19:30 (IST)

Bengal Warriors	52 – 21	Tamil Thalaivas
Maninder Singh (14)	Report	Himanshu (7)

Bengal Warriors won

Match 123
16 February 2022
20:30 (IST)

Telugu Titans	35 – 54	Jaipur Pink Panthers
Galla Raju (8)	Report	Arjun Deshwal (14)

Jaipur Pink Panthers won

Match 124
17 February 2022
19:30 (IST)

UP Yoddha	35 – 28	U Mumba
Surender Gill (8)	Report	V. Ajith Kumar (5)

UP Yoddha won

Match 125
17 February 2022
20:30 (IST)

Bengaluru Bulls	46 – 24	Haryana Steelers
Pawan Sehrawat (15)	Report	Vikash Khandola (4)

Bengaluru Bulls won

Match 126
17 February 2022
21:30 (IST)

Dabang Delhi	26 – 23	Patna Pirates
Vijay Malik (7)	Report	Mohit (3)

Dabang Delhi won

Match 127
18 February 2022
19:30 (IST)

Puneri Paltan	36 – 43	Bengal Warriors
Mohit Goyat (13)	Report	Maninder Singh (11)

Bengal Warriors won

Match 128
18 February 2022
20:30 (IST)

Telugu Titans	32 – 40	Dabang Delhi
Ankit Beniwal (9)	Report	Vijay Malik (6)

Dabang Delhi won

Match 129
18 February 2022
21:30 (IST)

Tamil Thalaivas	33 – 43	Gujarat Giants
Himanshu (7)	Report	Mahendra Ganesh Rajput (10)

Gujarat Giants won

Match 130
19 February 2022
19:30 (IST)

Jaipur Pink Panthers	30 – 37	Puneri Paltan
Arjun Deshwal (18)	Report	Mohit Goyat (9)

Puneri Paltan won

Match 131
19 February 2022
20:30 (IST)

Gujarat Giants	36 – 33	U Mumba
H.S. Rakesh (13)	Report	V. Ajith Kumar (11)

Gujarat Giants won

Match 132
19 February 2022
21:30 (IST)

Patna Pirates	30 – 27	Haryana Steelers
Sachin (8)	Report	Ashish (8)

Patna Pirates won

== Playoffs ==
=== Bracket ===
Eliminators
Eliminator 1
UP Yoddha	42
Puneri Paltan	31
Eliminator 2
Gujarat Giants	29
Bengaluru Bulls	49

Semi-finals
Semi-final 1
Patna Pirates	38
UP Yoddha	27
Semi-final 2
Dabang Delhi	40
Bengaluru Bulls	35

championship
Patna Pirates	36
Dabang Delhi	37

=== Eliminator 1 ===
Match 133
21 February 2022
19:30 (IST)

UP Yoddha	42 – 31	Puneri Paltan
Pardeep Narwal (18)	Report	Aslam Inamdar (10)

UP Yoddha won

=== Eliminator 2 ===
Match 134
21 February 2022
20:30 (IST)

Gujarat Giants	29 – 49	Bengaluru Bulls
H.S. Rakesh (8)	Report	Pawan Sehrawat (12)

Bengaluru Bulls won

=== Semi Final 1 ===
Match 135
23 February 2022
19:30 (IST)

Patna Pirates	38 – 27	UP Yoddha
Guman Singh (8)	Report	Shrikant Jadhav (8)

Patna Pirates won

=== Semi Final 2 ===
Match 136
23 February 2022
20:30 (IST)

Dabang Delhi	40 – 35	Bengaluru Bulls
Naveen Kumar (14)	Report	Pawan Sehrawat (18)

Dabang Delhi won

=== Final ===
Match 137
25 February 2022
20:30 (IST)

Patna Pirates	36 – 37	Dabang Delhi
Sachin Tanwar (9)	Report	Naveen Kumar (13)

Dabang Delhi Won

== Statistics ==
=== Most Raid Points ===
Rank	Player	Team	Matches	Raid Points
1	(India) Pawan Sehrawat	Bengaluru Bulls	24	304
2	(India) Arjun Deshwal	Jaipur Pink Panthers	22	267
3	(India) Maninder Singh	Bengal Warriors	22	262
4	(India) Naveen Kumar	Dabang Delhi	17	207
5	(India) Surender Gill	UP Yoddha	24	189
As of 25 February 2022.

=== Most Tackle Points ===
As of 25 February 2022.

Rank	Player	Team	Matches	Tackle Points
1	(Iran) Mohammadreza Chiyaneh	Patna Pirates	24	89
2	(India) Sagar	Tamil Thalaivas	22	82
3	(India) Saurabh Nandal	Bengaluru Bulls	24	69
4	(India) Jaideep	Haryana Steelers	22	66
5	(India) Sumit	UP Yoddha	24	62

=== Total Points ===
Rank	Player	Team	Matches	Total Points
1	(India) Pawan Sehrawat	Bengaluru Bulls	24	320
2	(India) Arjun Deshwal	Jaipur Pink Panthers	22	268
3	(India) Maninder Singh	Bengal Warriors	22	264
4	(India) Naveen Kumar	Dabang Delhi	17	210
5	(India) Surender Gill	UP Yoddha	23	198
As of 25 February 2022.
