= Mohammad Esmaeil Nabibakhsh =

Iranian kabaddi player (born 1991)

Personal information
- Nationality: Iranian
- Citizenship: Iranian
- Born: 17 September 1991 (age 35) Mazandaran province, Iran
- Occupation: Kabaddi Player
- Years active: 2019–present
- Height: 5 ft 10 in (178 cm)

Sport
- Country: Iran
- Sport: Kabaddi
- Position: Raider
- League: Pro Kabaddi League
- Club: Bengal Warriors (2019–2021); Puneri Paltan (2022); Gujarat Giants (2023-present)
- Coached by: BC Ramesh
Medal record
Representing Iran
Asian Games
Gold medal – first place	2018 Jakarta-Palembang	Team
Silver medal – second place	2022 Hangzhou	Team
Silver medal – second place	2026 Aichi–Nagoya	Team

Mohammad Esmaeil Nabibakhsh (Persian: محمد اسماعیل نبی‌بخش) also known as Moein Nabibakhsh is an Iranian professional Kabaddi player who currently plays as an all rounder for Gujarat Giants in the Pro Kabaddi League and represents Iran national kabaddi team in the international circuit. He was the part of Iran national kabaddi team that won gold in the 2018 Asian Games.

== Early life ==
He was born and brought up in Mazandaran province. Having gained popularity at the local level, he made his way into the Iran National Kabaddi Team. Currently he is pursuing a bachelor's degree in physical education in Shomal University.

== Career ==
In 2019, he started his Vivo Pro Kabaddi League journey after being purchased by Bengal Warriors. He was the most expensive foreign buy of the season at ₹77.75 lakh. He made his debut against UP Yoddha and scored a super 10 in that match. He proved to be a valuable asset for his team as he continued to contributing points both in raids and defence. He is one of the few players in the PKL to register a super 10 and high five both. After the team captain Maninder Singh dislocated his shoulder and become injured in a match against Dabang Delhi. He took over the captaincy and led the team by example in the semi-final and final. And Bengal Warriors won their first ever PKL trophy.

== Career statistics ==
As of 19 October 2019.

Club Team	Season	Total Apps	Raid Points	Tackle Points	Total Points
Bengal Warriors	2019	23	92	30	122
Total		23	92	30	122
