= 2019 Pro Kabaddi League =

7th Season of Pro Kabaddi League

Vivo Pro Kabaddi 2019 Season 7
- Le panga

Tournament information
- Dates: 20 July 2019–19 October 2019
- Administrator: Mashal Sports
- Tournament format(s): Double round robin and playoffs
- Host: India
- Teams: 12
- Website: prokabaddi.com

Final positions
- Champion: Bengal Warriors (1st title)
- Runner-up: Dabang Delhi

Tournament statistics
- Matches played: 137
- Top scorer: (India) Pawan Sehrawat (346) (Bengaluru Bulls)
- Most tackle points: (Iran) Fazel Atrachali (82) (U Mumba)
- Most successful raid: (India) Pawan Sehrawat (262) (Bengaluru Bulls)
- Most successful tackle: (Iran) Fazel Atrachali (77) (U Mumba)

The 2019 Vivo Pro Kabaddi League was the seventh season of Pro Kabaddi League. The season began on 20 July 2019 and concluded on 19 October 2019. The zonal system present in the previous seasons was removed, and each team played against all the other teams twice.

Bengal Warriors defeated Dabang Delhi in the final match to win their maiden title.

== Teams ==
Locations of the Pro Kabaddi teams

=== Stadiums and locations ===
Team	Colors	City	Stadium	Capacity
Bengal Warriorz		Kolkata, West Bengal	Netaji Indoor Stadium	15,000
Bengaluru Bulls		Bengaluru, Karnataka	Kanteerava Indoor Stadium	4,200
Dabang Delhi KC		New Delhi, Delhi	Thyagaraj Sports Complex	4,494
Gujarat Giants		Ahmedabad, Gujarat	EKA Arena	4,000
Haryana Steelers		Panchkula, Haryana	Motilal Nehru School of Sports	2,000
Jaipur Pink Panthers		Jaipur, Rajasthan	Sawai Mansingh Indoor Stadium	2,000
Patna Pirates		Patna, Bihar	Patliputra Sports Complex	3,500
Puneri Paltan		Pune, Maharashtra	Shree Shiv Chhatrapati Sports Complex	4,200
Tamil Thalaivas		Chennai, Tamil Nadu	Jawaharlal Nehru Stadium	5,000
Telugu Titans		Hyderabad, Telangana	Gachibowli Indoor Stadium	5,000
Telugu Titans		Visakhapatnam, Andhra Pradesh	Rajiv Gandhi Indoor Stadium	10,000
UP Yoddhas		Lucknow, Uttar Pradesh	Babu Banarasi Das Indoor Stadium	5,000
U Mumba		Mumbai, Maharashtra	Sardar Vallabhbhai Patel Indoor Stadium	8,000

=== Personnel and sponsorship ===
Teams	Owners	Captain	Head coach	Kit Manufacturer	Main Kit Sponsor	Associate Sponsor
Bengal Warriors	Kishore Biyani	(India) Maninder Singh	(India) BC Ramesh	Spunk	Future Pay	Voom Detergent
Bengaluru Bulls	Badri Narayan Choudhary Kota, Ananda Giri	(India) Rohit Kumar	(India) Randhir Singh Sherahawat	Vats	Ashirvad Pipes	Walkmate
Dabang Delhi KC	Radha Kapoor	(India) Joginder Narwal	(India) Krishan Kumar Hooda	Reforce	JK Super Cement	Officer's Choice Blue
Gujarat Fortune Giants	Gautam Adani	(India) Sunil Kumar	(India) Manpreet Singh	Shivnaresh	Finolex Cables	Fortune Foods
Haryana Steelers	Parth Jindal	(India) Dharmaraj Cheralathan	(India) Rakesh Kumar	T10 Sports	APL Apollo Steel Pipes	Borosil
Jaipur Pink Panthers	Abhishek Bachchan	(India) Deepak Niwas Hooda	(India) Srinivas Reddy	TYKA	Ambuja Cements	TVS
Patna Pirates	Rajesh V. Shah	(India) Pardeep Narwal	(India) Ram Mehar Singh	Pace International	Birla Gold Cement	Revital-H
Puneri Paltan	Rajesh Harkishandas Doshi, Sumanlal Babulal Shah, Nallepilly Ramaswami Subramanian	(India) PO Surjeet Singh	(India) Anup Kumar	Shiv Naresh	Force Motors	Netmeds
Tamil Thalaivas	Nimmagadda Prasad, Sachin Tendulkar, Allu Arjun, Ram Charan & Allu Aravind	(India) Ajay Thakur	(India) E Bhaskaran	Kaizen Sports & Fitness	Celon Labs	
Telugu Titans	Srinivas Sreeramaneni, Goutham Reddy Nedurmalli, Mahesh Kolli	(Iran) Abozar Mohajermighani	(Iran) Gholamreza Mazandarai	Vats	Greenko	Araku Coffee
U Mumba	Ronnie Screwvala	(Iran) Fazel Atrachali	(India) Sanjeev Kumar Baliyan		Indigo Paints	Haldiram's
UP Yoddha	Kiran Kumar Grandhi	(India) Nitesh kumar	(India) Jasveer Singh	Shivnaresh	Tata Yodha	Valvoline

=== Foreign players ===
Each team can sign maximum 3 foreign players in the squad.

Teams	Player 1	POS	Player 2	POS	Player 3	POS
Bengal Warriors	(Iran) Mohammad Esmaeil Nabibakhsh	AR	(Iran) Mohammad Taghi Paein Mahali	RD		
Bengaluru Bulls	(Nepal) Lal Mohar Yadav	RD	(Nepal) Sanjay Shrestha	AR		
Dabang Delhi KC	(Iran) Meraj Sheykh	AR	(Iran) Saeid Ghaffari	DF		
Gujarat Fortune Giants	(Iran) Abolfazl Maghsodloumahali	RD	(Bangladesh) Mohammed Shazid Hossain	AR		
Haryana Steelers	(Iran) Amirhossein Mohammed Maleki	RD	(Thailand) Tin Phonchoo	AR		
Jaipur Pink Panthers	(South Korea) Dong Gyu Kim	AR	(Sri Lanka) Milinda Chathuranga	RD		
Patna Pirates	(Iran) Hadi Oshtorak	AR	(South Korea) Lee Jang-kun	RD	(Iran) Mohammed Esmaeil Maghsoudlou Mohalli	RD
Puneri Paltan	(Iran) Emad Sedaghatnia	RD	(Iran) Hadi Tajik	DF		
Tamil Thalaivas	(Iran) Milad Sheibak	DF	(Kenya) Victor Onyango Obiero	AR		
Telugu Titans	(Iran) Abozar Mohajermighani	DF	(Iran) Farhad Rahimi Milaghardan	AR		
U Mumba	(South Korea) Dong Geon Lee	RD	(Iran) Fazel Atrachali	DF	(South Korea) Young Chang Ko	DF
UP Yoddha	(Bangladesh) MD. Masud Karim	RD	(Iran) Mohsen Maghsoudloujafari	AR		

== Sponsorship ==
Title Sponsor

- Vivo

Associate Sponsors

- Tata Motors
- Dream11
- Honda

Partners

- UltraTech Cement

Broadcast Sponsor

- Star Sports

== Viewership ==
Unlike the last season that witnessed a 31 percent dip in viewership data to 1.1 billion impressions from the 1.6 billion impressions of season five, PKL 7 has registered a growth of 9 percent in viewership numbers and has garnered 1.2 billion impressions, as per BARC India.

== Points table ==
Team	Pld	W	L	D	SD	Pts
Dabang Delhi KC (R)	22	15	4	3	66	85
Bengal Warriors (C)	22	14	5	3	71	83
UP Yoddha	22	13	7	2	9	74
U Mumba	22	12	8	2	47	72
Haryana Steelers	22	13	8	1	15	71
Bengaluru Bulls	22	11	10	1	16	64
Jaipur Pink Panthers	22	9	11	2	-13	58
Patna Pirates	22	8	13	1	29	51
Gujarat Forunte Giants	22	7	13	2	18	51
Puneri Paltan	22	7	12	3	-72	48
Telugu Titans	22	6	13	3	-67	45
Tamil Thalaivas	22	4	15	3	-119	37

Source: ProKabaddi

- advanced to Finals
- advanced to Eliminators
- Five (5) points for a win
- Three (3) points each for a drawn game
- One (1) point for a loss by 7 points or fewer
- Top 6 teams qualify for the playoffs

== League stage ==
=== Leg 1 – Gachibowli Indoor Stadium, Hyderabad ===
Match 1
20 July 2019
19:30

Telugu Titans	25–31	U Mumba
	Report

U Mumba won

Match 2
20 July 2019
20:30

Bengaluru Bulls	34–32	Patna Pirates
	Report

Bengaluru Bulls won

Match 3
21 July 2019
19:30

Bengaluru Bulls	24–42	Gujarat Fortune Giants
	Report

Gujarat Fortune Giants won

Match 4
21 July 2019
20:30

Telugu Titans	26–39	Tamil Thalaivas
	Report

Tamil Thalaivas won

Match 5
22 July 2019
19:30

U Mumba	23–42	Jaipur Pink Panthers
	Report

Jaipur Pink Panthers won

Match 6
22 July 2019
20:30

Puneri Paltan	24–34	Haryana Steelers
	Report

Haryana Steelers won

Match 7
24 July 2019
19:30

UP Yoddha	17–48	Bengal Warriors
	Report

Bengal Warriors won

Match 8
24 July 2019
20:30

Telugu Titans	33–34	Dabang Delhi
	Report

Dabang Delhi won

Match 9
25 July 2019
19:30

Dabang Delhi	30–29	Tamil Thalaivas
	Report

Dabang Delhi won

Match 10
26 July 2019
19:30

UP Yoddha	19–44	Gujarat Fortune Giants
	Report

Gujarat Fortunegiants won

Match 11
26 July 2019
20:30

Telugu Titans	22–34	Patna Pirates
	Report

Patna Pirates won

=== Leg 2 – Dome@NSCI SVP Stadium, Mumbai ===
Match 12
27 July 2019
19:30

U Mumba	33–23	Puneri Paltan
	Report

U Mumba won

Match 13
27 July 2019
20:30

Jaipur Pink Panthers	27–25	Bengal Warriors
	Report

Jaipur Pink Panthers won

Match 14
28 July 2019
19:30

Dabang Delhi	41–21	Haryana Steelers
	Report

Dabang Delhi won

Match 15
28 July 2019
20:30

U Mumba	26–30	Bengaluru Bulls
	Report

Bengaluru Bulls won

Match 16
29 July 2019
19:30

Tamil Thalaivas	23–24	Patna Pirates
	Report

Patna Pirates won

Match 17
29 July 2019
20:30

Bengal Warriors	43–23	Puneri Paltan
	Report

Bengal Warriors won

Match 18
31 July 2019
19:30

Haryana Steelers	21–37	Jaipur Pink Panthers
	Report

Jaipur Pink Panthers won

Match 19
31 July 2019
20:30

U Mumba	23–27	UP Yoddha
	Report

UP Yoddha won

Match 20
1 August 2019
19:30

Gujarat Fortune Giants	31–26	Dabang Delhi
	Report

Gujarat Fortune Giants won

Match 21
2 August 2019
19:30

Telugu Titans	20–20	UP Yoddha
	Report

Match tied

Match 22
2 August 2019
20:30

U Mumba	32–20	Gujarat Fortune Giants
	Report

U Mumba won

=== Leg 3 – Patliputra Sports Complex, Patna ===
Match 23
3 August 2019
19:30

Patna Pirates	21–34	Jaipur Pink Panthers
	Report

Jaipur Pink Panthers won

Match 24
3 August 2019
20:30

Bengal Warriors	42–43	Bengaluru Bulls
	Report

Bengaluru Bulls won

Match 25
4 August 2019
19:30

Haryana Steelers	28–35	Tamil Thalaivas
	Report

Tamil Thalaivas won

Match 26
4 August 2019
20:30

Patna Pirates	20–41	Puneri Paltan
	Report

Puneri Paltan won

Match 27
5 August 2019
19:30

Dabang Delhi	35–24	Jaipur Pink Panthers
	Report

Dabang Delhi won

Match 28
5 August 2019
20:30

Gujarat Fortune Giants	31–33	Puneri Paltan
	Report

Puneri Paltan won

Match 29
7 August 2019
19:30

UP Yoddha	28–28	Tamil Thalaivas
	Report

Match Tied

Match 30
7 August 2019
20:30

Patna Pirates	26–35	Haryana Steelers
	Report

Haryana Steelers won

Match 31
8 August 2019
19:30

Telugu Titans	26–47	Bengaluru Bulls
	Report

Bengaluru Bulls won

Match 32
9 August 2019
19:30

Bengal Warriors	32–30	U Mumba
	Report

Bengal Warriors won

Match 33
9 August 2019
20:30

Patna Pirates	41–20	UP Yoddha
	Report

Patna Pirates won

=== Leg 4 – The Arena, Ahmedabad ===
Match 34
10 August 2019
19:30

Gujarat Fortune Giants	28–34	Tamil Thalaivas
	Report

Tamil Thalaivas won

Match 35
10 August 2019
20:30

Puneri Paltan	30–32	Dabang Delhi
	Report

Dabang Delhi won

Match 36
11 August 2019
19:30

Bengaluru Bulls	30–33	Haryana Steelers
	Report

Haryana Steelers won

Match 37
11 August 2019
20:30

Gujarat Fortune Giants	24–30	Telugu Titans
	Report

Telugu Titans won

Match 38
12 August 2019
19:30

Bengal Warriors	29–29	Telugu Titans
	Report

Match tied

Match 39
12 August 2019
20:30

UP Yoddha	35–33	Bengaluru Bulls
	Report

UP Yoddha won

Match 40
14 August 2019
19:30

UP Yoddha	33–36	Haryana Steelers
	Report

Haryana Steelers won

Match 41
14 August 2019
20:30

Gujarat Fortune Giants	26–28	Bengal Warriors
	Report

Bengal Warriors won

Match 42
15 August 2019
19:30

Jaipur Pink Panthers	33–25	Puneri Paltan
	Report

Jaipur Pink Panthers won

Match 43
16 August 2019
19:30

U Mumba	34–30	Patna Pirates
	Report

U Mumba won

Match 44
16 August 2019
20:30

Gujarat Fortune Giants	19–22	Jaipur Pink Panthers
	Report

Jaipur Pink Panthers won

=== Leg 5 – Jawaharlal Nehru Indoor Stadium, Chennai ===
Match 45
17 August 2019
19:30

Tamil Thalaivas	21–32	Bengaluru Bulls
	Report

Bengaluru Bulls won

Match 46
17 August 2019
20:30

Bengal Warriors	30–30	Dabang Delhi
	Report

Match Tied

Match 47
18 August 2019
19:30

Haryana Steelers	29–40	Telugu Titans
	Report

Telugu Titans won

Match 48
18 August 2019
20:30

Tamil Thalaivas	31–31	Puneri Paltan
	Report

Match Tied

Match 49
19 August 2019
19:30

U Mumba	27–30	Haryana Steelers
	Report

Haryana Steelers won

Match 50
19 August 2019
20:30

UP Yoddha	31–24	Jaipur Pink Panthers
	Report

UP Yoddha won

Match 51
21 August 2019
19:30

Puneri Paltan	31–23	Bengaluru Bulls
	Report

Puneri Paltan won

Match 52
21 August 2019
20:30

Tamil Thalaivas	26–28	Jaipur Pink Panthers
	Report

Jaipur Pink Panthers won

Match 53
22 August 2019
19:30

Bengal Warriors	35–26	Patna Pirates
	Report

Bengal Warriors won

Match 54
23 August 2019
19:30

Gujarat Fortune Giants	29–26	Patna Pirates
	Report

Gujarat Fortune Giants won

Match 55
23 August 2019
20:30

Tamil Thalaivas	24–29	U Mumba
	Report

U Mumba won

=== Leg 6 – Thyagaraj Sports Complex, New Delhi ===
Match 56
24 August 2019
19:30

Dabang Delhi	33–31	Bengaluru Bulls
	Report

Dabang Delhi won

Match 57
24 August 2019
20:30

Jaipur Pink Panthers	21–24	Telugu Titans
	Report

Telugu Titans won

Match 58
25 August 2019
19:30

Jaipur Pink Panthers	30–41	Bengaluru Bulls
	Report

Bengaluru Bulls won

Match 59
25 August 2019
20:30

Dabang Delhi	36–27	UP Yoddha
	Report

Dabang Delhi won

Match 60
26 August 2019
19:30

Bengal Warriors	33–36	Haryana Steelers
	Report

Haryana Steelers won

Match 61
26 August 2019
20:30

UP Yoddha	35–30	Puneri Paltan
	Report

UP Yoddha won

Match 62
28 August 2019
19:30

Gujarat Fortune Giants	25–41	Haryana Steelers
	Report

Haryana Steelers won

Match 63
28 August 2019
20:30

Dabang Delhi	40–24	U Mumba
	Report

Dabang Delhi won

Match 64
29 August 2019
19:30

Bengal Warriors	35–26	Tamil Thalaivas
	Report

Bengal Warriors won

Match 65
30 August 2019
19:30

Telugu Titans	27–34	Puneri Paltan
	Report

Puneri Paltan won

Match 66
30 August 2019
20:30

Dabang Delhi	38–35	Patna Pirates
	Report

Dabang Delhi won

=== Leg 7 – Kanteerava Indoor Stadium, Bangalore ===
Match 67
31 August 2019
19:30

Bengaluru Bulls	23–32	Gujarat Fortune Giants
	Report

Gujarat Fortune Giants won

Match 68
31 August 2019
20:30

U Mumba	47–21	Jaipur Pink Panthers
	Report

U Mumba won

Match 69
1 September 2019
19:30

UP Yoddha	32–29	Bengal Warriors
	Report

UP Yoddha won

Match 70
1 September 2019
20:30

Bengaluru Bulls	33–27	Tamil Thalaivas
	Report

Bengaluru Bulls won

Match 71
2 September 2019
19:30

Puneri Paltan	27–41	Haryana Steelers
	Report

Haryana Steelers won

Match 72
2 September 2019
20:30

Telugu Titans	35–30	Tamil Thalaivas
	Report

Telugu Titans won

Match 73
4 September 2019
19:30

Jaipur Pink Panthers	44–46	Dabang Delhi
	Report

Dabang Delhi won

Match 74
4 September 2019
20:30

Bengaluru Bulls	40–39	Patna Pirates
	Report

Bengaluru Bulls won

Match 75
5 September 2019
19:30

Puneri Paltan	33–33	U Mumba
	Report

Match tied

Match 76
6 September 2019
19:30

Patna Pirates	29–41	UP Yoddha
	Report

UP Yoddha won

Match 77
6 September 2019
20:30

Bengaluru Bulls	40–39	Telugu Titans
	Report

Bengaluru Bulls won

=== Leg 8 – Netaji Subhas Chandra Bose Indoor Stadium, Kolkata ===
Match 78
7 September 2019
19:30

Bengal Warriors	25–25	Gujarat Fortune Giants
	Report

Match tied

Match 79
7 September 2019
20:30

Dabang Delhi	25–47	Haryana Steelers
	Report

Haryana Steelers won

Match 80
8 September 2019
19:30

Dabang Delhi	50–34	Tamil Thalaivas
	Report

Dabang Delhi won

Match 81
8 September 2019
20:30

Bengal Warriors	42–39	Puneri Paltan
	Report

Bengal Warriors won

Match 82
9 September 2019
19:30

UP Yoddha	33–26	Gujarat Fortune Giants
	Report

UP Yoddha won

Match 83
9 September 2019
20:30

Tamil Thalaivas	25–51	Patna Pirates
	Report

Patna Pirates won

Match 85
11 September 2019
19:30

Haryana Steelers	32–32	Jaipur Pink Panthers
	Report

Match tied

Match 86
11 September 2019
20:30

Bengal Warriors	29–26	U Mumba
	Report

Bengal Warriors won

Match 87
12 September 2019
19:30

Jaipur Pink Panthers	33–36	Patna Pirates
	Report

Patna Pirates won

Match 84
10 September 2019
19:30

Telugu Titans	27–41	U Mumba
	Report

U Mumba Won

Match 88
13 September 2019
20:30

Bengal Warriors	42–40	Bengaluru Bulls
	Report

Bengal Warriors won

=== Leg 9 – Shree Shiv Chhatrapati Sports Complex, Pune ===
Match 89
14 September 2019
19:30

Puneri Paltan	43–33	Gujarat Fortune Giants
	Report

Puneri Paltan won

Match 90
14 September 2019
20:30

Tamil Thalaivas	35–43	Haryana Steelers
	Report

Haryana Steelers won

Match 91
15 September 2019
19:30

Dabang Delhi	34–30	Gujarat Fortune Giants
	Report

Dabang Delhi won

Match 92
15 September 2019
20:30

Puneri Paltan	33–55	Patna Pirates
	Report

Patna Pirates won

Match 93
16 September 2019
19:30

Jaipur Pink Panthers	32–38	UP Yoddha
	Report

UP Yoddha won

Match 94
16 September 2019
20:30

Telugu Titans	29–37	Dabang Delhi
	Report

Dabang Delhi won

Match 95
18 September 2019
19:30

U Mumba	39–36	UP Yoddha
	Report

U Mumba won

Match 96
18 September 2019
20:30

Puneri Paltan	36–36	Tamil Thalaivas
	Report

Match tied

Match 97
19 September 2019
19:30

Bengal Warriors	48–36	Haryana Steelers
	Report

Bengal Warriors won

Match 98
20 September 2019
19:30

Telugu Titans	42–42	Patna Pirates
	Report

Match tied

Match 100
20 September 2019
20:30

Puneri Paltan	42–38	Bengaluru Bulls
	Report

Puneri Paltan won

=== Leg 10 – Sawai Mansingh Indoor Stadium, Jaipur ===
Match 100
21 September 2019
19:30

Jaipur Pink Panthers	28–28	Gujarat Fortune Giants
	Report

Match tied

Match 101
21 September 2019
20:30

UP Yoddha	42–22	Tamil Thalaivas
	Report

UP Yoddha won

Match 102
22 September 2019
19:30

U Mumba	31— 25	Gujarat Fortune Giants
	Report

U Mumba won

Match 103
22 September 2019
20:30

Jaipur Pink Panthers	40–41	Bengal Warriors
	Report

Bengal Warriors won

Match 104
23 September 2019
19:30

Patna Pirates	34–39	Haryana Steelers
	Report

Haryana Steelers won

Match 105
23 September 2019
20:30

Dabang Delhi	39–39	Bengaluru Bulls
	Report

Match tied

Match 106
25 September 2019
19:30

Telugu Titans	39–40	Bengal Warriors
	Report

Bengal Warriors won

Match 107
25 September 2019
20:30

Jaipur Pink Panthers	43–34	Puneri Paltan
	Report

Jaipur Pink Panthers won

Match 108
26 September 2019
19:30

Patna Pirates	39–43	Dabang Delhi
	Report

Dabang Delhi won

Match 109
27 September 2019
19:30

U Mumba	33–35	Bengaluru Bulls
	Report

Bengaluru Bulls won

Match 110
27 September 2019
20:30

Jaipur Pink Panthers	31— 51	Telugu Titans
	Report

Telugu Titans won

=== Leg 11 – Tau Devilal Sports Complex, Panchkula ===
Match 111
28 September 2019
19:30

Haryana Steelers	30–37	UP Yoddha
	Report

UP Yoddha won

Match 112
28 September 2019
20:30

Gujarat Fortune Giants	50–21	Tamil Thalaivas
	Report

Gujarat Fortune Giants won

Match 113
29 September 2019
19:30

Puneri Paltan	40–60	Dabang Delhi
	Report

Dabang Delhi won

Match 114
29 September 2019
20:30

Haryana Steelers	38–37	Gujarat Fortune Giants
	Report

Haryana Steelers won

Match 115
30 September 2019
19:30

Bengal Warriors	42–33	Dabang Delhi
	Report

Bengal Warriors won

Match 116
30 September 2019
20:30

Tamil Thalaivas	32–36	U Mumba
	Report

U Mumba won

Match 117
2 October 2019
19:30

U Mumba	30–26	Patna Pirates
	Report

U Mumba won

Match 118
2 October 2019
20:30

Haryana Steelers	36–59	Bengaluru Bulls
	Report

Bengaluru Bulls won

- Pawan Sehrawat scored the most raid points in a single match (39)

Match 119
3 October 2019
19:30

Telugu Titans	50–53	Puneri Paltan
	Report

Puneri Paltan won

Match 120
4 October 2019
19:30

Jaipur Pink Panthers	41–34	Bengaluru Bulls
	Report

Jaipur Pink Panthers won

Match 121
4 October 2019
20:30

Haryana Steelers	52–32	Telugu Titans
	Report

Haryana Steelers won

=== Leg 12 – Shaheed Vijay Singh Pathik Sports Complex, Greater Noida ===
Match 122
5 October 2019
19:30

UP Yoddha	50–33	Dabang Delhi
	Report

UP Yoddha won

Match 123
5 October 2019
20:30

Gujarat Fortune Giants	33–39	Patna Pirates
	Report

Patna Pirates won

Match 124
6 October 2019
19:30

Bengal Warriors	41–69	Patna Pirates
	Report

Patna Pirates won

- Most Points in a match (110).

Match 125
6 October 2019
20:30

UP Yoddha	43–39	Puneri Paltan
	Report

UP Yoddha won

Match 126
7 October 2019
19:30

Telugu Titans	38–48	Gujarat Fortune Giants
	Report

Gujarat Fortune Giants won

Match 127
7 October 2019
20:30

Tamil Thalaivas	35–33	Jaipur Pink Panthers
	Report

Tamil Thalaivas won

Match 128
9 October 2019
19:30

Bengal Warriors	33–29	Tamil Thalaivas
	Report

Bengal Warriors won

Match 129
9 October 2019
20:30

UP Yoddha	36–41	Telugu Titans
	Report

Telugu Titans won

Match 130
10 October 2019
19:30

U Mumba	39–33	Haryana Steelers
	Report

U Mumba won

Match 131
11 October 2019
19:30

Dabang Delhi	37–37	U Mumba
	Report

Match tied

Match 132
11 October 2019
20:30

UP Yoddha	45–33	Bengaluru Bulls
	Report

UP Yoddha won

== Playoffs ==
=== Bracket ===
Eliminators
The Arena, Ahmedabad
U Mumba	46
Haryana Steelers	38
The Arena, Ahmedabad
UP Yoddha	45
Bengaluru Bulls	48

Semi-finals
The Arena, Ahmedabad
Bengal Warriors	37
U Mumba	35
The Arena, Ahmedabad
Dabang Delhi	44
Bengaluru Bulls	38

Final
The Arena, Ahmedabad
Dabang Delhi	34
Bengal Warriors	39

=== Eliminator 1 ===
Match 133
14 October 2019
19:30

UP Yoddha	45 – 48	Bengaluru Bulls
	Report

Bengaluru Bulls won

=== Eliminator 2 ===
Match 134
14 October 2019
20:30

U Mumba	46 – 38	Haryana Steelers
	Report

U Mumba won

=== Semi Final 1 ===
Match 135
16 October 2019
19:30

Dabang Delhi	44 – 38	Bengaluru Bulls
	Report

Dabang Delhi won

=== Semi Final 2 ===
Match 136
16 October 2019
20:30

Bengal Warriors	37 – 35	U Mumba
	Report

Bengal Warriors won

=== Final ===
Match 137
19 October 2019
20:00

Dabang Delhi	34 – 39	Bengal Warriors
Naveen Kumar (18)	Report	Mohammad Esmaeil Nabibakhsh (9)

Bengal Warriors won

== Statistics ==
=== Best raiders ===
As of 19 October 2019

Rank	Player	Team	Matches	Total Points
1	(India) Pawan Sehrawat	Bengaluru Bulls	24	346
2	(India) Pardeep Narwal	Patna Pirates	22	302
3	(India) Naveen Kumar	Dabang Delhi	23	301
4	(India) Siddharth Desai	Telugu Titans	22	217
5	(India) Maninder Singh	Bengal Warriors	20	205

=== Best defenders ===
As of 19 October 2019

Rank	Player	Team	Matches	Tackle Points
1	(Iran) Fazel Atrachali	U Mumba	24	82
2	(India) Sumit	UP Yoddha	23	77
3	(India) Nitesh Kumar	UP Yoddha	23	75
4	(India) Sandeep Kumar Dhull	Jaipur Pink Panthers	22	73
5	(India) Baldev Singh	Bengal Warriors	24	66
