= Siddharth Desai (kabaddi) =

Indian kabaddi player

Personal information
- Full name: Siddharth Sirish Desai
- Nickname: Bahubali
- Nationality: Indian
- Occupation: Kabaddi player
- Height: 6 ft 4 in (193 cm)

Sport
- Country: India
- Sport: Kabaddi
- League: Pro Kabaddi League
- Club: U Mumba (2018); Telugu Titans (2019–2022); Haryana Steelers (2023)

Siddharth Sirish Desai (born 5 December 1991) is an Indian kabaddi player, who last represented Pro Kabaddi franchise Haryana Steelers . He had previously represented Air India and Maharashtra before making his Pro Kabaddi debut in Season 6 with U Mumba. Desai emerged as the highest-priced player during the Season 7 auction, as Telugu Titans secured his services with a bid of ₹1.45 Crore. He is one of the most decorated kabaddi players in India.

== Early life ==
Desai comes from a family of kabaddi enthusiasts, as both his father and brother, Suraj, are known to have participated in the sport. Although he dedicated himself to kabaddi from a young age, Desai also prioritized his academic pursuits with the guidance and support of his parents and brother. After completing his 12th-grade studies in science, Desai graduated from college with a BSc degree in physics. In addition to kabaddi, Desai has a passion for playing the guitar and singing. He finds the instrument to be a stress reliever and often dedicates at least an hour per day to playing it. Desai even has a YouTube channel where he uploads some renditions of his favourite songs.

== PKL career ==
=== Season 6 ===
After showcasing his skills during a successful tournament with Maharashtra at the Nationals, Desai received an opportunity to compete in Pro Kabaddi. He experienced a notably successful debut season with U Mumba, achieving several milestones. Desai became the quickest rookie to accumulate 200 raid points, achieving this feat in just 21 appearances with a total of 218 raid points. He also holds the record for being the fastest player to reach 50 raid points, tied for the fastest to reach 100 raid points, and boasted an impressive strike rate of 89.13% in Do-Or-Die raid attempts.

== PKL auction prices ==
Season	Club	Year	Sold price	Ref
VI	U Mumba	2018	₹36.40 Lakh	
VII	Telugu Titans	2019	₹1.45 Crore	
VIII	Telugu Titans	2021	₹1.30 Crore	
IX	Telugu Titans	2022	₹20.00 Lakh	
X	Haryana Steelers	2023	₹1.00 Crore	
XI	Dabang Delhi K.C	2024	₹26.00 Lakh	
Total			4.574 Crore	

Note - Siddharth Desai was ruled out of PKL 11 due to personal reasons after being auctioned.

== Career statistics ==
League	Team	Season	Year	Matches	Raid points	Super 10s	Tackle points	Total points
Pro Kabaddi League	U Mumba	VI	2018	21	218	12	3	221
Pro Kabaddi League	Telugu Titans	VII	2019	22	217	10	3	220
Pro Kabaddi League	Telugu Titans	VIII	2021	3	34	2	1	35
Pro Kabaddi League	Telugu Titans	IX	2022	17	142	6	2	144
Pro Kabaddi League	Haryana Steelers	X	2023	17	82	4	0	82
Total				80	693	34	9	702

== Records and achievements ==
- VIVO Pro Kabaddi Best Debutant (2019)
- 2023–24 PKL: Runner up
