= Bengaluru Bulls =

Indian kabaddi team based in Bengaluru

- Full name: Bengaluru Bulls
- Short name: BB
- Sport: Kabaddi
- Founded: 2013
- First season: 2014
- Last season: 2024
- League: PKL
- Based in: Bengaluru, India
- Location: Karnataka
- Stadium: Kanteerava Indoor Stadium
- Colors: Red, black, yellow
- Owner: Ashwin Mallaya ullal Mangalore
- Head coach: BC Ramesh
- Captain: Yogesh Dahiya
- Championships: (2018-19)
- Playoff berths: 6
- Website: bengalurubulls.com

Uniforms
Regular kit

Bengaluru Bulls is a professional kabaddi team based in Bengaluru that plays in the Pro Kabaddi League. The team were champions in the sixth season and are currently led by Yogesh Dahiya. The team is coached by BC Ramesh and owned by Ashwin Mallaya Ullal. Bulls play their home matches at the Kanteerava Indoor Stadium. Bulls are one of the most successful teams in PKL history after winning the trophy for the first time by defeating the Gujarat Fortune Giants in the 2018–19 season. The team was also the runner-up to U Mumba in 2015 and reached the semifinals in the inaugural 2014 season.

== Current squad ==
Bengaluru Bulls squad 2025
No	Name	Nat	Position
3	Ankush Rathee	(India)	Defender - Left Corner
33	Akash Shinde	(India)	Raider
	Pankaj	(India)	Raider
	Mahipal Palaram	(India)	Raider
	Manjeet Thakur	(India)	Raider
	Shubham Bitake	(India)	Raider
13	Aashish Malik	(India)	Right Raider
	Ganesha Hanamantagol	(India)	Right Raider
	Chandra Naik	(India)	All Rounder
	Amit Thakur	(India)	All-Rounder
	Dheeraj Rajveer	(India)	All Rounder
	Sachin Krishan	(India)	All-Rounder
	Jitender Yadav	(India)	All-Rounder
	Sahil Rane	(India)	All-Rounder
18	Alireza Mirzaian	(Iran)	All-Rounder
	Ahmad Asgari	(Iran)	All-Rounder
8	Yogesh Dahiya (c)	(India)	Defender - Right Corner
	Lucky Kumar	(India)	Defender - Right Cover
	Sanjay Dhull	(India)	Defender - Right Cover
	Satyappa Matti	(India)	Defender - Right Cover
	Shubham Rahate	(India)	Defender - Left Cover
45	Deepak Sankar	(India)	Defender - Left Corner
	Manish	(India)	Defender
	Badal Taqdir Singh	(India)	Defender
Source: Pro Kabaddi

== Seasons ==
=== Season I ===
Bulls secured fourth place in the first season.

Team	Pld	W	L	D	SD	Pts
Jaipur Pink Panthers (C)	14	10	3	1	100	54
U Mumba (R)	14	8	3	3	59	51
Bengaluru Bulls (4)	14	8	5	1	36	47
Patna Pirates (3)	14	7	5	2	18	45
Telugu Titans	14	6	5	3	26	42
Dabang Delhi KC	14	5	8	1	-27	32
Bengal Warriors	14	4	9	1	-85	24
Puneri Paltan	14	2	12	0	-127	17

Source: ProKabaddi

(C) Champion; (R) Runners-up; (3) Third Place; (4) Fourth Place.

- Advanced to the Playoff Stage
- Five points for a win
- Three points each for a drawn game
- One point for a loss by 7 points or fewer
- Top 4 teams qualified for the semifinals

=== Season II ===
Bengaluru Bulls finished second in the second season.

Team	Pld	W	L	D	SD	Pts
U Mumba (C)	14	12	2	0	40	60
Telugu Titans (3)	14	8	3	3	85	50
Bengaluru Bulls (R)	14	9	5	0	55	48
Patna Pirates (4)	14	7	6	1	-18	41
Jaipur Pink Panthers	14	6	7	1	43	38
Bengal Warriors	14	4	9	1	-63	27
Dabang Delhi KC	14	4	9	1	-68	27
Puneri Paltan	14	2	11	1	-74	21

Source: ProKabaddi
(C) Champion; (R) Runners-up; (3) Third Place; (4) Fourth Place.

- Advanced to the Playoff Stage
- Five points for a win
- Three points each for a drawn game
- One point for a loss by 7 points or fewer

=== Season III ===
Team	Pld	W	L	D	SD	Pts
U Mumba (R)	14	12	2	0	95	60
Patna Pirates (C)	14	10	2	2	104	58
Puneri Paltan (3)	14	7	4	3	92	48
Bengal Warriors (4)	14	9	5	0	26	47
Telugu Titans	14	7	7	0	-10	38
Jaipur Pink Panthers	14	4	8	2	-63	28
Bengaluru Bulls	14	2	12	0	-102	14
Dabang Delhi KC	14	1	12	1	-142	11

Source: ProKabaddi

(C) Champion; (R) Runners-up; (3) Third Place; (4) Fourth Place.

- Advanced to the Playoff Stage
- Five points for a win
- Three points each for a drawn game
- One point for a loss by 7 points or fewer

=== Season IV ===
Team	Pld	W	L	D	SD	Pts
Patna Pirates (C)	14	10	4	0	14	52
Telugu Titans	14	8	4	2	67	50
Jaipur Pink Panthers (R)	14	8	5	1	22	47
Puneri Paltan	14	6	6	2	23	42
U Mumba	14	7	6	1	-18	42
Bengaluru Bulls	14	5	8	1	-55	32
Dabang Delhi KC	14	4	9	1	7	29
Bengal Warriors	14	3	9	2	-60	26

Source:www.prokabaddi.com

- Advanced to the Playoff Stage
- Five points for a win
- Three points each for a drawn game
- One point for a loss by 7 points or fewer

=== Season V ===
The teams are divided into two zones with each zone having six teams based on their geographical proximity. Each team will play 15 intra-zonal matches and 7 inter-zonal matches.
Zone A

Team	Pld	W	L	D	SD	Pts
Gujarat Fortune Giants (R)	22	15	4	3	126	87
Puneri Paltan	22	15	7	0	91	80
Haryana Steelers	22	13	5	4	40	79
U Mumba	22	10	12	0	-50	56
Jaipur Pink Panthers	22	8	13	1	-91	51
Dabang Delhi KC	22	5	16	1	-134	29

Zone B

Team	Pld	W	L	D	SD	Pts
Bengal Warriors	22	11	5	6	19	77
Patna Pirates (C)	22	10	7	5	60	71
UP Yoddha	22	8	10	4	2	60
Bengaluru Bulls	22	8	11	3	10	57
Telugu Titans	22	7	12	3	-2	52
Tamil Thalaivas	22	6	14	2	-71	46

Source: ProKabaddi

- advanced to Qualifier 1
- advanced to Eliminators
- Five points for a win
- Three points each for a drawn game
- One point for a loss by 7 points or fewer

=== Season VI ===
The teams are divided into two zones with each zone having six teams based on their geographical proximity. Each team will play 15 intra-zonal matches and 7 inter-zonal matches.
Zone A

Team	Pld	W	L	D	SD	Pts
Gujarat Fortune Giants (R)	22	17	3	2	117	93
U Mumba	22	15	5	2	189	86
Dabang Delhi KC	22	11	9	2	-1	68
Puneri Paltan	22	8	12	2	-45	52
Jaipur Pink Panthers	22	6	13	3	-69	43
Haryana Steelers	22	6	14	2	-91	42

Zone B

Team	Pld	W	L	D	SD	Pts
Bengaluru Bulls (C)	22	13	7	2	104	78
Bengal Warriors	22	12	8	2	2	69
UP Yoddha	22	8	10	4	-45	57
Patna Pirates	22	9	11	2	-36	55
Telugu Titans	22	8	13	1	-55	51
Tamil Thalaivas	22	5	13	4	-70	42

Source: ProKabaddi

- advanced to Qualifier 1
- advanced to Eliminators
- Five points for a win
- Three points each for a drawn game
- One point for a loss by 7 points or fewer
- Top three teams from each zone qualify for the playoffs

=== Season VII ===
Team	Pld	W	L	D	SD	Pts
Dabang Delhi KC (R)	22	15	4	3	66	85
Bengal Warriors (C)	22	14	5	3	71	83
UP Yoddha	22	13	7	2	9	74
U Mumba	22	12	8	2	47	72
Haryana Steelers	22	13	8	1	15	71
Bengaluru Bulls	22	11	10	1	16	64
Jaipur Pink Panthers	22	9	11	2	-13	58
Patna Pirates	22	8	13	1	29	51
Gujarat Forunte Giants	22	7	13	2	18	51
Puneri Paltan	22	7	12	3	-72	48
Telugu Titans	22	6	13	3	-67	45
Tamil Thalaivas	22	4	15	3	-119	37

Source: ProKabaddi

- advanced to Finals
- advanced to Eliminators
- Five points for a win
- Three points each for a drawn game
- One point for a loss by 7 points or fewer
- Top 6 teams qualify for the playoffs

=== Season IX ===
Pos	Team	Pld	W	L	T	SD	Pts	
1	Jaipur Pink Panthers (C)	22	15	6	1	174	82	Qualification to semi finals
2	Puneri Paltan (R)	22	14	6	2	66	80	Qualification to semi finals
3	Bengaluru Bulls	22	13	8	1	39	74	Qualification to eliminators
4	UP Yoddha	22	12	8	2	42	71	Qualification to eliminators
5	Tamil Thalaivas	22	10	8	4	5	66	Qualification to eliminators
6	Dabang Delhi	22	10	10	2	17	63	Qualification to eliminators
7	Haryana Steelers	22	10	10	2	16	61	
8	Gujarat Giants	22	9	11	2	-16	59	
9	U Mumba	22	10	12	0	-28	56	
10	Patna Pirates	22	8	11	3	-58	54	
11	Bengal Warriors	22	8	11	3	-12	53	
12	Telugu Titans	22	2	20	0	-245	15	

Source: ProKabaddi
(C) Champion; (R) Runners Up
- 5 points for a win
- 3 points for a tied game
- 1 point for a loss by 7 points or fewer

=== Season X ===
Pos	Team	Pld	W	L	T	SD	Pts	
1	Puneri Paltan (C)	22	17	2	3	253	96	Qualification to semi finals
2	Jaipur Pink Panthers	22	16	3	3	141	92	Qualification to semi finals
3	Dabang Delhi	22	13	6	3	53	79	Qualification to eliminators
4	Gujarat Giants	22	13	9	0	32	70	Qualification to eliminators
5	Haryana Steelers (R)	22	13	8	1	-13	70	Qualification to eliminators
6	Patna Pirates	22	11	8	3	50	69	Qualification to eliminators
7	Bengal Warriors	22	9	11	2	-43	55	
8	Bengaluru Bulls	22	8	12	2	-67	53	
9	Tamil Thalaivas	22	9	13	0	32	51	
10	U Mumba	22	6	13	3	-79	45	
11	UP Yoddhas	22	4	17	1	-116	31	
12	Telugu Titans	22	2	19	1	-243	21	

Source: ProKabaddi
Rules for classification:
- 5 points for a win
- 3 points for a tied game
- 1 point for a loss by 7 points or fewer
(C) Champion; (R) Runners Up

== Records ==
Seasons	Total	Wins	Tied	Losses	% Win	Position
Season 1	16	8	1	7	56.25%	3
Season 2	16	10	0	6	62.50%	Runner-ups
Season 3	14	2	0	12	14.23%	7
Season 4	14	5	1	8	42.85%	6
Season 5	22	8	3	11	50.00%	4
Season 6	24	15	2	7	62.58%	Champions
Season 7	24	12	1	11	52.50%	3
Season 8	22	11	9	2	54.54%	5
Season 9	22	13	8	1	59.09%	3
Season 10	22	8	2	12	36.36%	8
Season 11	18	11	-	7	61.11%	5

=== By opposition ===
Note: Table lists in alphabetical order.

Opposition	Played	Won	Lost	Drawn	% Win
Bengal Warriors	22	9	13	0	40.9%
Dabang Delhi	21	9	10	2	42.9%
Gujarat Fortune Giants	12	5	6	1	41.7%
Haryana Steelers	9	5	4	0	55.6%
Jaipur Pink Panthers	19	9	9	1	47.4%
Patna Pirates	22	7	12	3	31.8%
Puneri Paltan	17	7	10	0	41.2%
Tamil Thalaivas	14	11	3	0	78.57%
Telugu Titans	22	15	3	4	68.2%
U Mumba	19	5	14	0	26.3%
UP Yoddha	15	9	6	0	60%
Total	192	91	90	11	47.39%

== Sponsors ==
Year	Season	Kit manufacturer	Main sponsor	Back sponsor	Sleeve sponsor
2014	I			Golden Harvest	
2015	II	Vats	Kotak	Golden Harvest	AirAsia
2016	III			Karbonn Mobiles	Unlimited
2016	IV	Omtex		Karbonn Mobiles	Unlimited
2017	V	ARMR	Karbonn Mobiles	Kent RO	GEM Home Appliances
2018	VI	Shiv-Naresh	AbhiPaisa	O&O Academy	Xiaomi
2019	VII	Vats	Ashirvad Pipes	Walkmate	AbhiPaisa
2021	VIII	TYKA	1xNews	Breathing Room	Herbalife Nutrition
2022	IX	Vats	VST Tillers	Breathing Room	Breathing Room
2023	X	Vats	VST Tillers		Surfa Coats Paints
2024	XI	Vats	Vision11	White Gold	Surfa Coats Paints
2025	XII	Vats	White Gold	Valvoline	
