= Puneri Paltan =

Professional kabaddi team

- Full name: Puneri Paltan
- Short name: PUN
- Sport: Kabaddi
- Founded: 2014
- First season: 2014
- Last season: 2024
- League: PKL
- Based in: Pune
- Location: Maharashtra
- Arena: Shree Shiv Chhatrapati Sports Complex
- Colours
- Owner: Insurekot Sports LLC
- Head coach: Ajay Thakur
- Captain: (India) Aslam Inamdar
- Championships: (2023)
- League titles: 1
- Website: puneripaltan.com

Puneri Paltan is a professional kabaddi team that represents the city of Pune, Maharashtra in the Pro Kabaddi League. The team, coached by Ajay Thakur and assistant coach Ashok Shinde, plays at the Shree Shiv Chhatrapati Sports Complex. In the 10th season of the Pro Kabaddi League, they won their first ever trophy after beating Haryana Steelers in the Final and are defending champions of the league. They won the Sport Franchise of the year award at the Confederation of Indian Industry (CII) Sports Business Awards ceremony which held at New Delhi in October 2024.

== Overview ==
The Pro Kabaddi League's first season was in 2014, with eight teams including Paltan. Four teams were added for the league's fifth season, bringing the total to 12.

The logo features a lion, representing the team's mascot, in a saffron hue—a color deeply rooted in Maharashtrian culture.

== Colours, logo and mascot ==
=== Colours ===
Puneri Paltan's current team colors are orange and vermilion, traditional colors in Maratha culture. Though the logo was changed in Season VII, its colours remained the same.

=== Logo and mascot ===
Puneri Paltan's former logo had Dhal (shield) & two talwars behind it. An illustration of a side-faced lionhead was also present in that logo. There was a Chandrakor on the 'i' of the word 'puneri'. The logo had orange and silver colours.

The current logo was introduced in Season VII. The new logo has a front-facing lion-head illustration. The lion has a white Chandrakor Tilak on its forehead. The Lion gives a sense of dominance, power, & strength.

== Current squad ==
Puneri Paltan squad
| No | Name | Nat | Position |
|---|---|---|---|
| 3 | Aslam Inamdar (c) | (India) | All-Rounder |
| 12 | Pankaj Mohite (vc) | (India) | Raider |
| 88 | Mohit Goyat | (India) | Raider |
| 99 | Sachin Tanwar | (India) | Raider |
| 11 | Aditya Shinde | (India) | Raider |
| | Abhishek Gunge | (India) | Right Raider |
| | Stuwart Singh | (India) | Right Raider |
| 2 | Mohammad Nabibakhsh | (Iran) | Raider |
| | Milad Mohajer | (Iran) | Raider |
| | Gurdeep Sangwan | (India) | All-Rounder |
| 7 | Vishal Bhardwaj | (India) | Defender |
| 20 | Gaurav Khatri | (India) | Defender - Right Corner |
| | Sanjay Enania | (India) | Defender - Right Corner |
| 22 | Dadaso Pujari | (India) | Defender - Right Corner |
| 4 | Abinesh Nadarajan | (India) | Defender - Right Cover |
| | Vaibhav Rabade | (India) | Defender - Right Cover |
| | Rakesh Rajesh | (India) | Defender - Left Corner |
| | Mohd Amaan | (India) | Defender - Left Corner |
| | Rohan Tupare | (India) | Defender |
Source: Pro Kabaddi

== Seasons ==
=== Season I ===
Puneri Paltan finished eighth in its first season.

| Team | Pld | W | L | D | SD | Pts |
|---|---|---|---|---|---|---|
| Jaipur Pink Panthers (C) | 14 | 10 | 3 | 1 | 100 | 54 |
| U Mumba (R) | 14 | 8 | 3 | 3 | 59 | 51 |
| Bengaluru Bulls (4) | 14 | 8 | 5 | 1 | 36 | 47 |
| Patna Pirates (3) | 14 | 7 | 5 | 2 | 18 | 45 |
| Telugu Titans | 14 | 6 | 5 | 3 | 26 | 42 |
| Dabang Delhi KC | 14 | 5 | 8 | 1 | -27 | 32 |
| Bengal Warriors | 14 | 4 | 9 | 1 | -85 | 24 |
| Puneri Paltan | 14 | 2 | 12 | 0 | -127 | 17 |

Source: ProKabaddi

(C) Champion; (R) Runners-up; (3) Third Place; (4) Fourth Place.

- Advanced to the Playoff Stage
- Five (5) points for a win
- Three (3) points each for a drawn game
- One (1) point for a loss by 7 points or fewer
- Top 4 teams qualified for the semifinals

=== Season II ===
Puneri Paltan finished last in the second consecutive season.

| Team | Pld | W | L | D | SD | Pts |
|---|---|---|---|---|---|---|
| U Mumba (C) | 14 | 12 | 2 | 0 | 40 | 60 |
| Telugu Titans (3) | 14 | 8 | 3 | 3 | 85 | 50 |
| Bengaluru Bulls (R) | 14 | 9 | 5 | 0 | 55 | 48 |
| Patna Pirates (4) | 14 | 7 | 6 | 1 | -18 | 41 |
| Jaipur Pink Panthers | 14 | 6 | 7 | 1 | 43 | 38 |
| Bengal Warriors | 14 | 4 | 9 | 1 | -63 | 27 |
| Dabang Delhi KC | 14 | 4 | 9 | 1 | -68 | 27 |
| Puneri Paltan | 14 | 2 | 11 | 1 | -74 | 21 |

Source: ProKabaddi
(C) Champion; (R) Runners-up; (3) Third Place; (4) Fourth Place.

- Advanced to the Playoff Stage
- Five (5) points for a win
- Three (3) points each for a drawn game
- One (1) point for a loss by 7 points or fewer

=== Season III ===
| Team | Pld | W | L | D | SD | Pts |
|---|---|---|---|---|---|---|
| U Mumba (R) | 14 | 12 | 2 | 0 | 95 | 60 |
| Patna Pirates (C) | 14 | 10 | 2 | 2 | 104 | 58 |
| Puneri Paltan (3) | 14 | 7 | 4 | 3 | 92 | 48 |
| Bengal Warriors (4) | 14 | 9 | 5 | 0 | 26 | 47 |
| Telugu Titans | 14 | 7 | 7 | 0 | -10 | 38 |
| Jaipur Pink Panthers | 14 | 4 | 8 | 2 | -63 | 28 |
| Bengaluru Bulls | 14 | 2 | 12 | 0 | -102 | 14 |
| Dabang Delhi KC | 14 | 1 | 12 | 1 | -142 | 11 |

Source: ProKabaddi

(C) Champion; (R) Runners-up; (3) Third Place; (4) Fourth Place.

- Advanced to the Playoff Stage
- Five (5) points for a win
- Three (3) points each for a drawn game
- One (1) point for a loss by 7 points or fewer

=== Season IV ===
| Team | Pld | W | L | D | SD | Pts |
|---|---|---|---|---|---|---|
| Patna Pirates (C) | 14 | 10 | 4 | 0 | 14 | 52 |
| Telugu Titans | 14 | 8 | 4 | 2 | 67 | 50 |
| Jaipur Pink Panthers (R) | 14 | 8 | 5 | 1 | 22 | 47 |
| Puneri Paltan | 14 | 6 | 6 | 2 | 23 | 42 |
| U Mumba | 14 | 7 | 6 | 1 | -18 | 42 |
| Bengaluru Bulls | 14 | 5 | 8 | 1 | -55 | 32 |
| Dabang Delhi KC | 14 | 4 | 9 | 1 | 7 | 29 |
| Bengal Warriors | 14 | 3 | 9 | 2 | -60 | 26 |

Source:www.prokabaddi.com

- Advanced to the Playoff Stage
- Five (5) points for a win
- Three (3) points each for a drawn game
- One (1) point for a loss by 7 points or fewer

=== Season V ===
Bengal Warriors finished 8th in the Fourth season. The teams are divided into two zones with each zone having six teams based on their geographical proximity. Each team will play 15 intra-zonal matches and 7 inter-zonal matches.
Zone A

| Team | Pld | W | L | D | SD | Pts |
|---|---|---|---|---|---|---|
| Gujarat Fortune Giants (R) | 22 | 15 | 4 | 3 | 126 | 87 |
| Puneri Paltan | 22 | 15 | 7 | 0 | 91 | 80 |
| Haryana Steelers | 22 | 13 | 5 | 4 | 40 | 79 |
| U Mumba | 22 | 10 | 12 | 0 | -50 | 56 |
| Jaipur Pink Panthers | 22 | 8 | 13 | 1 | -91 | 51 |
| Dabang Delhi KC | 22 | 5 | 16 | 1 | -134 | 29 |

Zone B

| Team | Pld | W | L | D | SD | Pts |
|---|---|---|---|---|---|---|
| Bengal Warriors | 22 | 11 | 5 | 6 | 19 | 77 |
| Patna Pirates (C) | 22 | 10 | 7 | 5 | 60 | 71 |
| UP Yoddha | 22 | 8 | 10 | 4 | 2 | 60 |
| Bengaluru Bulls | 22 | 8 | 11 | 3 | 10 | 57 |
| Telugu Titans | 22 | 7 | 12 | 3 | -2 | 52 |
| Tamil Thalaivas | 22 | 6 | 14 | 2 | -71 | 46 |

Source: ProKabaddi

- advanced to Qualifier 1
- advanced to Eliminators
- Five (5) points for a win
- Three (3) points each for a drawn game
- One (1) point for a loss by 7 points or fewer

=== Season VI ===
The teams are divided into two zones with each zone having six teams based on their geographical proximity. Each team will play 15 intra-zonal matches and 7 inter-zonal matches.
Zone A

| Team | Pld | W | L | D | SD | Pts |
|---|---|---|---|---|---|---|
| Gujarat Fortune Giants (R) | 22 | 17 | 3 | 2 | 117 | 93 |
| U Mumba | 22 | 15 | 5 | 2 | 189 | 86 |
| Dabang Delhi KC | 22 | 11 | 9 | 2 | -1 | 68 |
| Puneri Paltan | 22 | 8 | 12 | 2 | -45 | 52 |
| Jaipur Pink Panthers | 22 | 6 | 13 | 3 | -69 | 43 |
| Haryana Steelers | 22 | 6 | 14 | 2 | -91 | 42 |

Zone B

| Team | Pld | W | L | D | SD | Pts |
|---|---|---|---|---|---|---|
| Bengaluru Bulls (C) | 22 | 13 | 7 | 2 | 104 | 78 |
| Bengal Warriors | 22 | 12 | 8 | 2 | 2 | 69 |
| UP Yoddha | 22 | 8 | 10 | 4 | -45 | 57 |
| Patna Pirates | 22 | 9 | 11 | 2 | -36 | 55 |
| Telugu Titans | 22 | 8 | 13 | 1 | -55 | 51 |
| Tamil Thalaivas | 22 | 5 | 13 | 4 | -70 | 42 |

Source: ProKabaddi

- advanced to Qualifier 1
- advanced to Eliminators
- Five (5) points for a win
- Three (3) points each for a drawn game
- One (1) point for a loss by 7 points or fewer
- Top three teams from each zone qualify for the playoffs

=== Season VII ===
| Team | Pld | W | L | D | SD | Pts |
|---|---|---|---|---|---|---|
| Dabang Delhi KC (R) | 22 | 15 | 4 | 3 | 66 | 85 |
| Bengal Warriors (C) | 22 | 14 | 5 | 3 | 71 | 83 |
| UP Yoddha | 22 | 13 | 7 | 2 | 9 | 74 |
| U Mumba | 22 | 12 | 8 | 2 | 47 | 72 |
| Haryana Steelers | 22 | 13 | 8 | 1 | 15 | 71 |
| Bengaluru Bulls | 22 | 11 | 10 | 1 | 16 | 64 |
| Jaipur Pink Panthers | 22 | 9 | 11 | 2 | -13 | 58 |
| Patna Pirates | 22 | 8 | 13 | 1 | 29 | 51 |
| Gujarat Forunte Giants | 22 | 7 | 13 | 2 | 18 | 51 |
| Puneri Paltan | 22 | 7 | 12 | 3 | -72 | 48 |
| Telugu Titans | 22 | 6 | 13 | 3 | -67 | 45 |
| Tamil Thalaivas | 22 | 4 | 15 | 3 | -119 | 37 |

Source: ProKabaddi

- advanced to Finals
- advanced to Eliminators
- Five (5) points for a win
- Three (3) points each for a drawn game
- One (1) point for a loss by 7 points or fewer
- Top 6 teams qualify for the playoffs

=== Season VIII ===
| Pos | Team | Pld | W | L | T | SD | Pts | |
|---|---|---|---|---|---|---|---|---|
| 1 | Patna Pirates (R) | 22 | 16 | 5 | 1 | 120 | 86 | Qualification to semi finals |
| 2 | Dabang Delhi (C) | 22 | 12 | 6 | 4 | -3 | 75 | Qualification to semi finals |
| 3 | UP Yoddha | 22 | 10 | 9 | 3 | 33 | 68 | Qualification to eliminators |
| 4 | Gujarat Giants | 22 | 10 | 8 | 4 | 2 | 67 | Qualification to eliminators |
| 5 | Bengaluru Bulls | 22 | 11 | 9 | 2 | 53 | 66 | Qualification to eliminators |
| 6 | Puneri Paltan | 22 | 12 | 9 | 1 | 33 | 66 | Qualification to eliminators |
| 7 | Haryana Steelers | 22 | 10 | 9 | 3 | -28 | 64 | |
| 8 | Jaipur Pink Panthers | 22 | 10 | 10 | 2 | 14 | 63 | |
| 9 | Bengal Warriors | 22 | 9 | 10 | 3 | -18 | 57 | |
| 10 | U Mumba | 22 | 7 | 10 | 5 | -34 | 55 | |
| 11 | Tamil Thalaivas | 22 | 5 | 11 | 6 | -42 | 47 | |
| 12 | Telugu Titans | 22 | 1 | 17 | 4 | -130 | 27 | |

Updated to match(es) played on 25 February 2022. Source: ProKabaddi
(C) Champion; (R) Runners Up
- Five (5) points for a win
- Three (3) points each for a drawn game
- One (1) point for a loss by 7 points or fewer

=== Season IX ===
| Pos | Team | Pld | W | L | T | SD | Pts | |
|---|---|---|---|---|---|---|---|---|
| 1 | Jaipur Pink Panthers (C) | 22 | 15 | 6 | 1 | 174 | 82 | Qualification to semi finals |
| 2 | Puneri Paltan (R) | 22 | 14 | 6 | 2 | 66 | 80 | Qualification to semi finals |
| 3 | Bengaluru Bulls | 22 | 13 | 8 | 1 | 39 | 74 | Qualification to eliminators |
| 4 | UP Yoddha | 22 | 12 | 8 | 2 | 42 | 71 | Qualification to eliminators |
| 5 | Tamil Thalaivas | 22 | 10 | 8 | 4 | 5 | 66 | Qualification to eliminators |
| 6 | Dabang Delhi | 22 | 10 | 10 | 2 | 17 | 63 | Qualification to eliminators |
| 7 | Haryana Steelers | 22 | 10 | 10 | 2 | 16 | 61 | |
| 8 | Gujarat Giants | 22 | 9 | 11 | 2 | -16 | 59 | |
| 9 | U Mumba | 22 | 10 | 12 | 0 | -28 | 56 | |
| 10 | Patna Pirates | 22 | 8 | 11 | 3 | -58 | 54 | |
| 11 | Bengal Warriors | 22 | 8 | 11 | 3 | -12 | 53 | |
| 12 | Telugu Titans | 22 | 2 | 20 | 0 | -245 | 15 | |

Source: ProKabaddi
(C) Champion; (R) Runners Up
- 5 points for a win
- 3 points for a tied game
- 1 point for a loss by 7 points or fewer

=== Season X ===
| Pos | Team | Pld | W | L | T | SD | Pts | |
|---|---|---|---|---|---|---|---|---|
| 1 | Puneri Paltan (C) | 22 | 17 | 2 | 3 | 253 | 96 | Qualification to semi finals |
| 2 | Jaipur Pink Panthers | 22 | 16 | 3 | 3 | 141 | 92 | Qualification to semi finals |
| 3 | Dabang Delhi | 22 | 13 | 6 | 3 | 53 | 79 | Qualification to eliminators |
| 4 | Gujarat Giants | 22 | 13 | 9 | 0 | 32 | 70 | Qualification to eliminators |
| 5 | Haryana Steelers (R) | 22 | 13 | 8 | 1 | -13 | 70 | Qualification to eliminators |
| 6 | Patna Pirates | 22 | 11 | 8 | 3 | 50 | 69 | Qualification to eliminators |
| 7 | Bengal Warriors | 22 | 9 | 11 | 2 | -43 | 55 | |
| 8 | Bengaluru Bulls | 22 | 8 | 12 | 2 | -67 | 53 | |
| 9 | Tamil Thalaivas | 22 | 9 | 13 | 0 | 32 | 51 | |
| 10 | U Mumba | 22 | 6 | 13 | 3 | -79 | 45 | |
| 11 | UP Yoddhas | 22 | 4 | 17 | 1 | -116 | 31 | |
| 12 | Telugu Titans | 22 | 2 | 19 | 1 | -243 | 21 | |

Source: ProKabaddi
Rules for classification:
- 5 points for a win
- 3 points for a tied game
- 1 point for a loss by 7 points or fewer
(C) Champion; (R) Runners Up

== Records ==
| Seasons | Total | Wins | Tied | Losses | % Win | Table Position |
|---|---|---|---|---|---|---|
| Season 1 | 14 | 2 | 0 | 12 | 14.29% | Group stage |
| Season 2 | 14 | 2 | 1 | 11 | 17.86% | Group stage |
| Season 3 | 16 | 8 | 3 | 5 | 59.38% | 3rd place |
| Season 4 | 16 | 7 | 2 | 7 | 50.00% | 3rd place |
| Season 5 | 24 | 16 | 0 | 8 | 66.67% | Eliminator |
| Season 6 | 22 | 8 | 2 | 12 | 40.91% | Group stage |
| Season 7 | 22 | 7 | 3 | 12 | 38.64% | Group stage |
| Season 8 | 23 | 12 | 1 | 10 | 56.81% | Eliminator |
| Season 9 | 24 | 15 | 2 | 7 | 66.67% | Runners-up |
| Season 10 | 24 | 19 | 3 | 2 | 85.42% | Champions |
| Season 11 | 22 | 9 | 3 | 10 | 47.73% | Group stage |
| Season 12 | 21 | 14 | 0 | 7 | 66.67% | Runners-up |

=== By opposition ===
Note: Table lists in alphabetical order.

| Opposition | Played | Won | Lost | Drawn | % Win |
|---|---|---|---|---|---|
| Bengal Warriors | 22 | 14 | 8 | 2 | 62.50% |
| Bengaluru Bulls | 22 | 15 | 7 | 0 | 68.18% |
| Dabang Delhi | 28 | 13 | 12 | 3 | 51.79% |
| Gujarat Fortune Giants | 17 | 8 | 8 | 1 | 50.00% |
| Haryana Steelers | 18 | 10 | 7 | 1 | 58.33% |
| Jaipur Pink Panthers | 26 | 11 | 14 | 2 | 44.44% |
| Patna Pirates | 26 | 6 | 16 | 4 | 30.77% |
| Tamil Thalaivas | 14 | 8 | 4 | 2 | 64.29% |
| Telugu Titans | 24 | 14 | 9 | 1 | 60.42% |
| U Mumba | 26 | 12 | 11 | 3 | 51.92% |
| UP Yoddha | 16 | 8 | 7 | 1 | 53.13% |
| Total | 240 | 118 | 104 | 20 | 52.89% |

== Sponsors ==
| Year | Season | Kit manufacturer | Main sponsor | Back sponsor | Sleeve sponsor |
|---|---|---|---|---|---|
| 2014 | I | | | | |
| 2015 | II | Dida | Kolte-Patil | Kosmik Music | Radio City |
| 2016 | III | Dida | Kotak | Coverfox | Red FM |
| 2016 | IV | Equio | Force Motors | TVS Tyres | Sakal |
| 2017 | V | Equio | Force Motors | Syska | Kirloskar |
| 2018 | VI | Equio | Force Motors | Kotak | Xiaomi |
| 2019 | VII | Shiv-Naresh | Force Motors | Astro | Kotak |
| 2021 | VIII | Shiv-Naresh | Indigo Paints | Schaeffler | Stihl |
| 2022 | IX | Shiv-Naresh | Force Motors | Schaeffler | Stihl |
| 2023 | X | Shiv-Naresh | Force Motors | Schaeffler | Stihl |
| 2024 | XI | Shiv-Naresh | Force Motors | Batery | Stihl |
| 2025 | XII | Shiv-Naresh | Force Motors | | Stihl |
