= Shree Shiv Chhatrapati Sports Complex velodrome =

Velodrome in Pune, Maharashtra, India

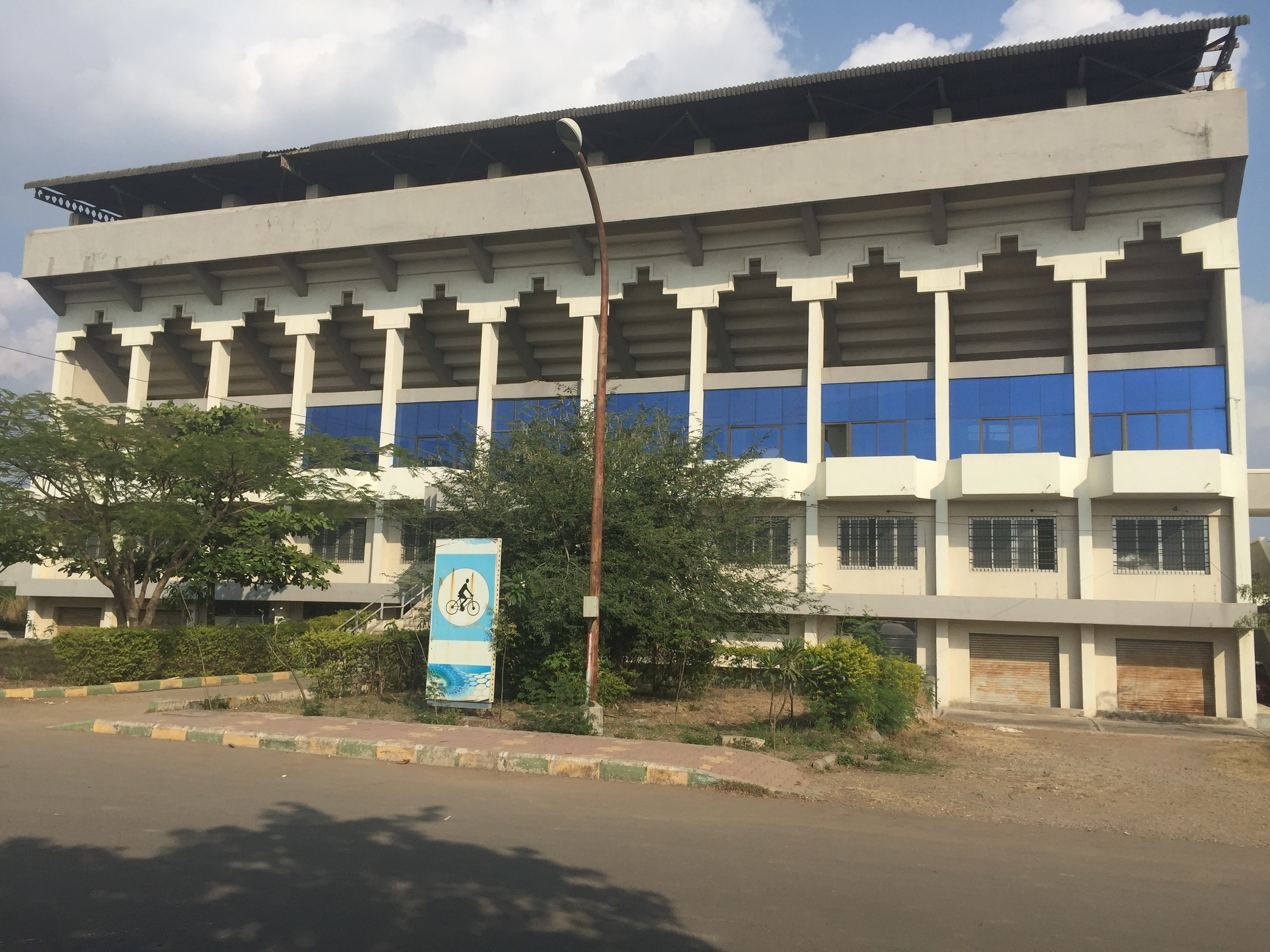
- Entrance of the velodrome (December 2015)
- Interactive map of Shree Shiv Chhatrapati Sports Complex velodrome
- Location: Shree Shiv Chhatrapati Sports Complex, Pune, India
- Coordinates: 18.574745°N 73.760984°E
- Surface: Concrete

Construction
- Groundbreaking: 1992
- Built: 1993
- Renovated: From 2014

Tenant
- 1994 National Games of India

The Velodrome at the Shree Shiv Chhatrapati Sports Complex is an outdoor velodrome in Pune, Maharashtra, India. The surface of the velodrome is made of concrete and the length of the track is 333.33 m or 1,093.6 ft. While the velodrome was a prime venue for the 1994 National Games of India it has never been a place for any major events thereafter, and was left unused. As there were no cycling events at the 2008 Commonwealth Youth Games held at the Shree Shiv Chhatrapati Sports Complex, the velodrome was not used as a competition venue during these Games.

In 2014 it was announced that with a Rs 10 crore maintenance grant from the governments for the entire Shree Shiv Chhatrapati Sports Complex, the facelift of the velodrome had top priority. At that time the velodrome was in dilapidated state.

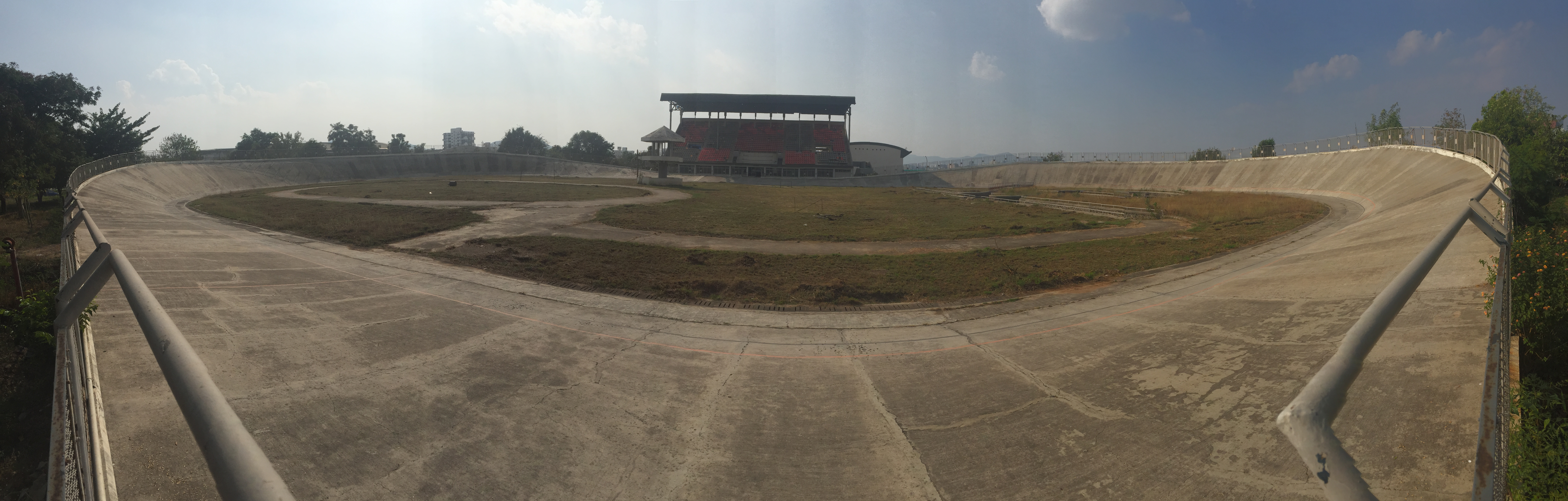
Panoramic picture of the velodrome (December 2015)

== See also ==
- List of cycling tracks and velodromes
