= Bengal Warriorz =

Indian Pro kabaddi team

- Full name: Bengal Warriorz
- Nickname: The Den Of Warriorz
- Short name: BW
- Sport: Kabaddi
- Founded: 2014
- First season: 2014
- Last season: -
- League: PKL
- Location: Kolkata, West Bengal
- Stadium: Netaji Indoor Stadium (15,000)
- Colours
- Owner: Capri Global
- Head coach: Naveen Kumar Bazzad & Praveen Malik
- Captain: Devank Dalal and Nitesh Kumar (Defence captain)
- Championships: (2019)
- League titles: 1
- Playoff berths: 4
- Website: Bengalwarriorz.com

Bengal Warriorz is a professional kabaddi team based in Kolkata, West Bengal that plays in the Pro Kabaddi League. In 2019, they won the trophy for the first time by defeating Dabang Delhi. The team is currently led by Devank Dalal and coached by Naveen Kumar Bazzad & Praveen Malik.

== Franchise history ==
Bengal Warriorz are owned by Future Group, promoted by Kishore Biyani. The team had poor campaign in the first two seasons. The team's performance, however improved from the third season as they qualified for the playoffs in 2016. But again after a disappointing season in the 2016 Pro Kabaddi League season (June), they totally revamped their squad. After that, the team has consistently qualified for the playoffs in 2017, 2018 and in 2019 respectively. In 2019, they qualified to the PKL final for the first time in their history by beating U Mumba in The Arena. In the final, against Dabang Delhi, they were trailing on 3–11 at one stage. However they made a strong comeback and won the final by a 39–34 margin without their captain Maninder Singh who sustained a shoulder injury in the penultimate league stage. Thus they clinched their first ever PKL title.

== Current squad ==
Full Squad of Bengal Warriorz for Pro Kabaddi League Season 12,2025.

| No | Name | Nat | Position |
|---|---|---|---|
| 3 | Devank Dalal (C) | (India) | Right Raider |
| 2 | Nitesh Kumar (Defence Captain) | (India) | Right Corner |
| | Rachit Kumar | (India) | Right Raider |
| 8 | Manprit | (India) | Right Raider |
| 9 | Vishwas S | (India) | Right Raider |
| 77 | Sushil Kambarekar | (India) | Right Raider |
| 78 | Himanshu Narwal | (India) | Left Raider |
| | Punit Kumar | (India) | Left Raider |
| 4 | Jang Kun Lee | (South Korea) | Left Raider |
| | Omid Mohammadshah | (Iran) | Left Raider |
| | Moolchandra Singh | (India) | All Rounder |
| | Shivansh Thakur | (India) | All-Rounder |
| 33 | Deep Kumar | (India) | Right Cover |
| 17 | Mayur Kadam | (India) | Right Cover |
| | Parteek Gulia | (India) | Left Cover |
| | Manjeet | (India) | Left Cover |
| 10 | Ashish mallik | (India) | Left Corner |
| | Amandeep Singh | (India) | Right Corner |
| | Harander | (India) | Right Corner |
| | Sandeep Saini | (India) | Right Corner |
| 55 | Ankit | (India) | Right Corner |
| | Yash Malik | (India) | Left Corner |
Source: Pro Kabaddi

== Seasons ==
=== Season I ===
Bengal Warriors finished seventh in the first season.

| Team | Pld | W | L | D | SD | Pts |
|---|---|---|---|---|---|---|
| Jaipur Pink Panthers (C) | 14 | 10 | 3 | 1 | 100 | 54 |
| U Mumba (R) | 14 | 8 | 3 | 3 | 59 | 51 |
| Bengaluru Bulls (4) | 14 | 8 | 5 | 1 | 36 | 47 |
| Patna Pirates (3) | 14 | 7 | 5 | 2 | 18 | 45 |
| Telugu Titans | 14 | 6 | 5 | 3 | 26 | 42 |
| Dabang Delhi KC | 14 | 5 | 8 | 1 | -27 | 32 |
| Bengal Warriors | 14 | 4 | 9 | 1 | -85 | 24 |
| Puneri Paltan | 14 | 2 | 12 | 0 | -127 | 17 |

Source: ProKabaddi

(C) Champion; (R) Runners-up; (3) Third Place; (4) Fourth Place.

- Advanced to the Playoff Stage
- Five points for a win
- Three points each for a drawn game
- One point for a loss by 7 points or fewer
- Top 4 teams qualified for the semifinals

=== Season II ===
Bengal Warriors finished 6th in the second season.

| Team | Pld | W | L | D | SD | Pts |
|---|---|---|---|---|---|---|
| U Mumba (C) | 14 | 12 | 2 | 0 | 40 | 60 |
| Telugu Titans (3) | 14 | 8 | 3 | 3 | 85 | 50 |
| Bengaluru Bulls (R) | 14 | 9 | 5 | 0 | 55 | 48 |
| Patna Pirates (4) | 14 | 7 | 6 | 1 | -18 | 41 |
| Jaipur Pink Panthers | 14 | 6 | 7 | 1 | 43 | 38 |
| Bengal Warriors | 14 | 4 | 9 | 1 | -63 | 27 |
| Dabang Delhi KC | 14 | 4 | 9 | 1 | -68 | 27 |
| Puneri Paltan | 14 | 2 | 11 | 1 | -74 | 21 |

Source: ProKabaddi
(C) Champion; (R) Runners-up; (3) Third Place; (4) Fourth Place.

- Advanced to the Playoff Stage
- Five points for a win
- Three points each for a drawn game
- One point for a loss by 7 points or fewer

=== Season III ===
Bengal Warriors finished 4th in the third season.

| Team | Pld | W | L | D | SD | Pts |
|---|---|---|---|---|---|---|
| U Mumba (R) | 14 | 12 | 2 | 0 | 95 | 60 |
| Patna Pirates (C) | 14 | 10 | 2 | 2 | 104 | 58 |
| Puneri Paltan (3) | 14 | 7 | 4 | 3 | 92 | 48 |
| Bengal Warriors (4) | 14 | 9 | 5 | 0 | 26 | 47 |
| Telugu Titans | 14 | 7 | 7 | 0 | -10 | 38 |
| Jaipur Pink Panthers | 14 | 4 | 8 | 2 | -63 | 28 |
| Bengaluru Bulls | 14 | 2 | 12 | 0 | -102 | 14 |
| Dabang Delhi KC | 14 | 1 | 12 | 1 | -142 | 11 |

Source: ProKabaddi

(C) Champion; (R) Runners-up; (3) Third Place; (4) Fourth Place.

- Advanced to the Playoff Stage
- Five points for a win
- Three points each for a drawn game
- One point for a loss by 7 points or fewer

=== Season IV ===
| Team | Pld | W | L | D | SD | Pts |
|---|---|---|---|---|---|---|
| Patna Pirates (C) | 14 | 10 | 4 | 0 | 14 | 52 |
| Telugu Titans | 14 | 8 | 4 | 2 | 67 | 50 |
| Jaipur Pink Panthers (R) | 14 | 8 | 5 | 1 | 22 | 47 |
| Puneri Paltan | 14 | 6 | 6 | 2 | 23 | 42 |
| U Mumba | 14 | 7 | 6 | 1 | -18 | 42 |
| Bengaluru Bulls | 14 | 5 | 8 | 1 | -55 | 32 |
| Dabang Delhi KC | 14 | 4 | 9 | 1 | 7 | 29 |
| Bengal Warriors | 14 | 3 | 9 | 2 | -60 | 26 |

Source:www.prokabaddi.com

- Advanced to the Playoff Stage
- Five points for a win
- Three points each for a drawn game
- One point for a loss by 7 points or fewer

=== Season V ===
Bengal Warriors finished 8th in the Fourth season. The teams are divided into two zones with each zone having six teams based on their geographical proximity. Each team will play 15 intra-zonal matches and 7 inter-zonal matches.
Zone A

| Team | Pld | W | L | D | SD | Pts |
|---|---|---|---|---|---|---|
| Gujarat Fortune Giants (R) | 22 | 15 | 4 | 3 | 126 | 87 |
| Puneri Paltan | 22 | 15 | 7 | 0 | 91 | 80 |
| Haryana Steelers | 22 | 13 | 5 | 4 | 40 | 79 |
| U Mumba | 22 | 10 | 12 | 0 | -50 | 56 |
| Jaipur Pink Panthers | 22 | 8 | 13 | 1 | -91 | 51 |
| Dabang Delhi KC | 22 | 5 | 16 | 1 | -134 | 29 |

Zone B

| Team | Pld | W | L | D | SD | Pts |
|---|---|---|---|---|---|---|
| Bengal Warriors | 22 | 11 | 5 | 6 | 19 | 77 |
| Patna Pirates (C) | 22 | 10 | 7 | 5 | 60 | 71 |
| UP Yoddha | 22 | 8 | 10 | 4 | 2 | 60 |
| Bengaluru Bulls | 22 | 8 | 11 | 3 | 10 | 57 |
| Telugu Titans | 22 | 7 | 12 | 3 | -2 | 52 |
| Tamil Thalaivas | 22 | 6 | 14 | 2 | -71 | 46 |

Source: ProKabaddi

- advanced to Qualifier 1
- advanced to Eliminators
- Five points for a win
- Three points each for a drawn game
- One point for a loss by 7 points or fewer

=== Season VI ===
The teams are divided into two zones with each zone having six teams based on their geographical proximity. Each team will play 15 intra-zonal matches and 7 inter-zonal matches.
Zone A

| Team | Pld | W | L | D | SD | Pts |
|---|---|---|---|---|---|---|
| Gujarat Fortune Giants (R) | 22 | 17 | 3 | 2 | 117 | 93 |
| U Mumba | 22 | 15 | 5 | 2 | 189 | 86 |
| Dabang Delhi KC | 22 | 11 | 9 | 2 | -1 | 68 |
| Puneri Paltan | 22 | 8 | 12 | 2 | -45 | 52 |
| Jaipur Pink Panthers | 22 | 6 | 13 | 3 | -69 | 43 |
| Haryana Steelers | 22 | 6 | 14 | 2 | -91 | 42 |

Zone B

| Team | Pld | W | L | D | SD | Pts |
|---|---|---|---|---|---|---|
| Bengaluru Bulls (C) | 22 | 13 | 7 | 2 | 104 | 78 |
| Bengal Warriors | 22 | 12 | 8 | 2 | 2 | 69 |
| UP Yoddha | 22 | 8 | 10 | 4 | -45 | 57 |
| Patna Pirates | 22 | 9 | 11 | 2 | -36 | 55 |
| Telugu Titans | 22 | 8 | 13 | 1 | -55 | 51 |
| Tamil Thalaivas | 22 | 5 | 13 | 4 | -70 | 42 |

Source: ProKabaddi

- advanced to Qualifier 1
- advanced to Eliminators
- Five points for a win
- Three points each for a drawn game
- One point for a loss by 7 points or fewer
- Top three teams from each zone qualify for the playoffs

=== Season VII ===
Bengal Warriors became the Champions.

| Team | Pld | W | L | D | SD | Pts |
|---|---|---|---|---|---|---|
| Dabang Delhi KC (R) | 22 | 15 | 4 | 3 | 66 | 85 |
| Bengal Warriors (C) | 22 | 14 | 5 | 3 | 71 | 83 |
| UP Yoddha | 22 | 13 | 7 | 2 | 9 | 74 |
| U Mumba | 22 | 12 | 8 | 2 | 47 | 72 |
| Haryana Steelers | 22 | 13 | 8 | 1 | 15 | 71 |
| Bengaluru Bulls | 22 | 11 | 10 | 1 | 16 | 64 |
| Jaipur Pink Panthers | 22 | 9 | 11 | 2 | -13 | 58 |
| Patna Pirates | 22 | 8 | 13 | 1 | 29 | 51 |
| Gujarat Forunte Giants | 22 | 7 | 13 | 2 | 18 | 51 |
| Puneri Paltan | 22 | 7 | 12 | 3 | -72 | 48 |
| Telugu Titans | 22 | 6 | 13 | 3 | -67 | 45 |
| Tamil Thalaivas | 22 | 4 | 15 | 3 | -119 | 37 |

Source: ProKabaddi

- advanced to Finals
- advanced to Eliminators
- Five points for a win
- Three points each for a drawn game
- One point for a loss by 7 points or fewer
- Top 6 teams qualify for the playoffs

=== Season VIII ===
| Pos | Team | Pld | W | L | T | SD | Pts | |
|---|---|---|---|---|---|---|---|---|
| 1 | Patna Pirates (R) | 22 | 16 | 5 | 1 | 120 | 86 | Qualification to semi finals |
| 2 | Dabang Delhi (C) | 22 | 12 | 6 | 4 | -3 | 75 | Qualification to semi finals |
| 3 | UP Yoddha | 22 | 10 | 9 | 3 | 33 | 68 | Qualification to eliminators |
| 4 | Gujarat Giants | 22 | 10 | 8 | 4 | 2 | 67 | Qualification to eliminators |
| 5 | Bengaluru Bulls | 22 | 11 | 9 | 2 | 53 | 66 | Qualification to eliminators |
| 6 | Puneri Paltan | 22 | 12 | 9 | 1 | 33 | 66 | Qualification to eliminators |
| 7 | Haryana Steelers | 22 | 10 | 9 | 3 | -28 | 64 | |
| 8 | Jaipur Pink Panthers | 22 | 10 | 10 | 2 | 14 | 63 | |
| 9 | Bengal Warriors | 22 | 9 | 10 | 3 | -18 | 57 | |
| 10 | U Mumba | 22 | 7 | 10 | 5 | -34 | 55 | |
| 11 | Tamil Thalaivas | 22 | 5 | 11 | 6 | -42 | 47 | |
| 12 | Telugu Titans | 22 | 1 | 17 | 4 | -130 | 27 | |

Updated to match(es) played on 25 February 2022. Source: ProKabaddi
(C) Champion; (R) Runners Up
- Five points for a win
- Three points each for a drawn game
- One point for a loss by 7 points or fewer

=== Season IX ===
| Pos | Team | Pld | W | L | T | SD | Pts | |
|---|---|---|---|---|---|---|---|---|
| 1 | Jaipur Pink Panthers (C) | 22 | 15 | 6 | 1 | 174 | 82 | Qualification to semi finals |
| 2 | Puneri Paltan (R) | 22 | 14 | 6 | 2 | 66 | 80 | Qualification to semi finals |
| 3 | Bengaluru Bulls | 22 | 13 | 8 | 1 | 39 | 74 | Qualification to eliminators |
| 4 | UP Yoddha | 22 | 12 | 8 | 2 | 42 | 71 | Qualification to eliminators |
| 5 | Tamil Thalaivas | 22 | 10 | 8 | 4 | 5 | 66 | Qualification to eliminators |
| 6 | Dabang Delhi | 22 | 10 | 10 | 2 | 17 | 63 | Qualification to eliminators |
| 7 | Haryana Steelers | 22 | 10 | 10 | 2 | 16 | 61 | |
| 8 | Gujarat Giants | 22 | 9 | 11 | 2 | -16 | 59 | |
| 9 | U Mumba | 22 | 10 | 12 | 0 | -28 | 56 | |
| 10 | Patna Pirates | 22 | 8 | 11 | 3 | -58 | 54 | |
| 11 | Bengal Warriors | 22 | 8 | 11 | 3 | -12 | 53 | |
| 12 | Telugu Titans | 22 | 2 | 20 | 0 | -245 | 15 | |

Source: ProKabaddi
(C) Champion; (R) Runners Up
- 5 points for a win
- 3 points for a tied game
- 1 point for a loss by 7 points or fewer

=== Season X ===
| Pos | Team | Pld | W | L | T | SD | Pts | |
|---|---|---|---|---|---|---|---|---|
| 1 | Puneri Paltan (C) | 22 | 17 | 2 | 3 | 253 | 96 | Qualification to semi finals |
| 2 | Jaipur Pink Panthers | 22 | 16 | 3 | 3 | 141 | 92 | Qualification to semi finals |
| 3 | Dabang Delhi | 22 | 13 | 6 | 3 | 53 | 79 | Qualification to eliminators |
| 4 | Gujarat Giants | 22 | 13 | 9 | 0 | 32 | 70 | Qualification to eliminators |
| 5 | Haryana Steelers (R) | 22 | 13 | 8 | 1 | -13 | 70 | Qualification to eliminators |
| 6 | Patna Pirates | 22 | 11 | 8 | 3 | 50 | 69 | Qualification to eliminators |
| 7 | Bengal Warriors | 22 | 9 | 11 | 2 | -43 | 55 | |
| 8 | Bengaluru Bulls | 22 | 8 | 12 | 2 | -67 | 53 | |
| 9 | Tamil Thalaivas | 22 | 9 | 13 | 0 | 32 | 51 | |
| 10 | U Mumba | 22 | 6 | 13 | 3 | -79 | 45 | |
| 11 | UP Yoddhas | 22 | 4 | 17 | 1 | -116 | 31 | |
| 12 | Telugu Titans | 22 | 2 | 19 | 1 | -243 | 21 | |

Source: ProKabaddi
Rules for classification:
- 5 points for a win
- 3 points for a tied game
- 1 point for a loss by 7 points or fewer
(C) Champion; (R) Runners Up

== Records ==
| Seasons | Total | Wins | Losses | Tied | % Win | Position |
|---|---|---|---|---|---|---|
| Season 1 | 14 | 4 | 9 | 1 | 32.14% | Group stage |
| Season 2 | 14 | 4 | 9 | 1 | 32.14% | Group stage |
| Season 3 | 16 | 9 | 7 | 0 | 56.25% | 4th |
| Season 4 | 14 | 3 | 9 | 2 | 28.57% | Group stage |
| Season 5 | 24 | 11 | 7 | 6 | 58.33% | Qualifier-2 |
| Season 6 | 23 | 12 | 9 | 2 | 56.52% | Eliminator |
| Season 7 | 24 | 16 | 5 | 3 | 72.92% | Champions |
| Season 8 | 22 | 9 | 10 | 3 | 47.73% | Group stage |
| Season 9 | 22 | 8 | 11 | 3 | 36.36% | Group stage |
| Season 10 | 22 | 9 | 11 | 2 | 40.9% | Group stage |
| Season 11 | 22 | 5 | 14 | 3 | 35.7% | Group stage |

=== By opposition ===
Note: Table lists in alphabetical order.

| Opposition | Played | Won | Lost | Drawn | % Win |
|---|---|---|---|---|---|
| Bengaluru Bulls | 24 | 15 | 9 | 0 | 62.5% |
| Dabang Delhi | 23 | 9 | 10 | 4 | 39.1% |
| Gujarat Fortune Giants | 13 | 4 | 7 | 2 | 30.7% |
| Haryana Steelers | 12 | 3 | 9 | 0 | 25.0% |
| Jaipur Pink Panthers | 20 | 10 | 9 | 1 | 50.0% |
| Patna Pirates | 25 | 6 | 16 | 3 | 24.0% |
| Puneri Paltan | 22 | 8 | 12 | 2 | 36.3% |
| Tamil Thalaivas | 16 | 10 | 5 | 1 | 62.5% |
| Telugu Titans | 24 | 14 | 5 | 5 | 58.3% |
| U Mumba | 22 | 5 | 15 | 2 | 22.7% |
| UP Yoddha | 16 | 6 | 4 | 6 | 37.5% |
| Total | 217 | 90 | 101 | 26 | 41.4% |

== Sponsors ==
| Year | Season | Kit manufacturer | Main sponsor | Back sponsor | Sleeve sponsor |
|---|---|---|---|---|---|
| 2014 | I | TYKA | Ching's Secret | Future Generali | Tasty Treat |
| 2015 | II | TYKA | Tasty Treat | Future Generali | T24 Mobile |
| 2016 | III | TYKA | Big Bazaar | Future Generali | Tasty Treat |
| 2016 | IV | TYKA | Big Bazaar | Future Generali | Tasty Treat |
| 2017 | V | TYKA | fbb | Golden Harvest | Tasty Treat |
| 2018 | VI | Spunk | Future Pay | fbb | Tasty Treat |
| 2019 | VII | Spunk | Future Pay | Voom | Tasty Treat |
| 2021 | VIII | Spunk | WinZO | Big Bazaar | Tasty Treat |
| 2022 | IX | Omtex | DafaNews | Capri Loans | Bikaji |
| 2023 | X | | DafaNews | Kajaria | Royal Green |
| 2024 | XI | | DafaNews | Kajaria | League11 |
| 2025 | XII | SIX5SIX | KEI | Sennheiser | Phab |
