= Dabang Delhi K.C. =

Professional kabaddi team based in New Delhi, India

- Full name: Dabang Delhi Kabaddi Club
- Founded: 2014; 12 years ago
- First season: 2014
- Last season: 2025
- Based in: New Delhi, India
- Home ground: Thyagaraj Sports Complex (4,949)
- Colors
- Owner: Radha Kapoor
- Head coach: Joginder Narwal
- Captain: Ashu Malik
- Championships: 2021-22, 2025
- League titles: 2
- Website: dabangdelhikc.com

Uniforms
Regular kit	Red kit

Dabang Delhi K.C. is a professional kabaddi team based in New Delhi, India, that competes in the Pro Kabaddi League. It is owned by Radha Kapoor and plays its home matches at the Thyagaraj Sports Complex. The team is currently captained by Ashu Malik and coached by Joginder Narwal. In 2022, Delhi won their maiden PKL title defeating Patna Pirates in the 2021–22 season final and won their second title in 2025 by defeating Puneri Paltan.

== Current squad ==
Dabang Delhi K.C. squad 2025
Jersey No	Name	Nationality	Position
77	Ashu Malik (c)	India	Raider
1	Fazel Atrachali (vc)	Iran	Defender - Left Corner
9	Neeraj Narwal	India	Raider
19	Ajinkya Pawar	India	Raider
	Vijay	India	Raider
	Anil Gurjar	India	Raider
2	Akshit Dhull	India	Left Raider
	Mohit Deswal	India	Right Raider
	Ashish Sangwan	India	All-Rounder
44	Naveen Rawal	India	All-Rounder
	Amit	India	All-Rounder
	Arkam Shaikh	India	All-Rounder
6	Surjeet Singh	India	Defender - Right Cover
	Gaurav Chhillar	India	Defender - Right Cover
22	Saurabh Nandal	India	Defender - Left Corner
	Mohit Narwal	India	Defender - Left Cover
60	Sandeep Deswal	India	Defender - Left Cover
	Anurag Kumar	India	Defender - Left Corner
	Raman Singh	India	Defender - Right Corner
	Amir Hossain	Iran	Defender - Right Corner
Source: Pro Kabaddi

== Seasons ==
=== Season I ===
Delhi finished sixth in the first season.

Team	Pld	W	L	D	SD	Pts
Jaipur Pink Panthers (C)	14	10	3	1	100	54
U Mumba (R)	14	8	3	3	59	51
Bengaluru Bulls (4)	14	8	5	1	36	47
Patna Pirates (3)	14	7	5	2	18	45
Telugu Titans	14	6	5	3	26	42
Dabang Delhi KC	14	5	8	1	-27	32
Bengal Warriors	14	4	9	1	-85	24
Puneri Paltan	14	2	12	0	-127	17

Source: ProKabaddi

(C) Champion; (R) Runners-up; (3) Third Place; (4) Fourth Place.

- Advanced to the Playoff Stage
- Five points for a win
- Three points each for a drawn game
- One point for a loss by 7 points or fewer
- Top 4 teams qualified for the semifinals

=== Season II ===
Dabang Delhi finished 7th in the second season.

Team	Pld	W	L	D	SD	Pts
U Mumba (C)	14	12	2	0	40	60
Telugu Titans (3)	14	8	3	3	85	50
Bengaluru Bulls (R)	14	9	5	0	55	48
Patna Pirates (4)	14	7	6	1	-18	41
Jaipur Pink Panthers	14	6	7	1	43	38
Bengal Warriors	14	4	9	1	-63	27
Dabang Delhi KC	14	4	9	1	-68	27
Puneri Paltan	14	2	11	1	-74	21

Source: ProKabaddi
(C) Champion; (R) Runners-up; (3) Third Place; (4) Fourth Place.

- Advanced to the Playoff Stage
- Five points for a win
- Three points each for a drawn game
- One point for a loss by 7 points or fewer

=== Season III ===
Dabang Delhi finished 8th in the Third season.

Team	Pld	W	L	D	SD	Pts
U Mumba (R)	14	12	2	0	95	60
Patna Pirates (C)	14	10	2	2	104	58
Puneri Paltan (3)	14	7	4	3	92	48
Bengal Warriors (4)	14	9	5	0	26	47
Telugu Titans	14	7	7	0	-10	38
Jaipur Pink Panthers	14	4	8	2	-63	28
Bengaluru Bulls	14	2	12	0	-102	14
Dabang Delhi KC	14	1	12	1	-142	11

Source: ProKabaddi

(C) Champion; (R) Runners-up; (3) Third Place; (4) Fourth Place.

- Advanced to the Playoff Stage
- Five points for a win
- Three points each for a drawn game
- One point for a loss by 7 points or fewer

=== Season IV ===
Team	Pld	W	L	D	SD	Pts
Patna Pirates (C)	14	10	4	0	14	52
Telugu Titans	14	8	4	2	67	50
Jaipur Pink Panthers (R)	14	8	5	1	22	47
Puneri Paltan	14	6	6	2	23	42
U Mumba	14	7	6	1	-18	42
Bengaluru Bulls	14	5	8	1	-55	32
Dabang Delhi KC	14	4	9	1	7	29
Bengal Warriors	14	3	9	2	-60	26

Source:www.prokabaddi.com

- Advanced to the Playoff Stage
- Five points for a win
- Three points each for a drawn game
- One point for a loss by 7 points or fewer

=== Season V ===
Dabang Delhi finished 7th in the Fourth season. The teams are divided into two zones with each zone having six teams based on their geographical proximity. Each team will play 15 intra-zonal matches and 7 inter-zonal matches.
Zone A

Team	Pld	W	L	D	SD	Pts
Gujarat Fortune Giants (R)	22	15	4	3	126	87
Puneri Paltan	22	15	7	0	91	80
Haryana Steelers	22	13	5	4	40	79
U Mumba	22	10	12	0	-50	56
Jaipur Pink Panthers	22	8	13	1	-91	51
Dabang Delhi KC	22	5	16	1	-134	29

Zone B

Team	Pld	W	L	D	SD	Pts
Bengal Warriors	22	11	5	6	19	77
Patna Pirates (C)	22	10	7	5	60	71
UP Yoddha	22	8	10	4	2	60
Bengaluru Bulls	22	8	11	3	10	57
Telugu Titans	22	7	12	3	-2	52
Tamil Thalaivas	22	6	14	2	-71	46

Source: ProKabaddi

- advanced to Qualifier 1
- advanced to Eliminators
- Five points for a win
- Three points each for a drawn game
- One point for a loss by 7 points or fewer

=== Season VI ===
The teams are divided into two zones with each zone having six teams based on their geographical proximity. Each team will play 15 intra-zonal matches and 7 inter-zonal matches.
Zone A

Team	Pld	W	L	D	SD	Pts
Gujarat Fortune Giants (R)	22	17	3	2	117	93
U Mumba	22	15	5	2	189	86
Dabang Delhi KC	22	11	9	2	-1	68
Puneri Paltan	22	8	12	2	-45	52
Jaipur Pink Panthers	22	6	13	3	-69	43
Haryana Steelers	22	6	14	2	-91	42

Zone B

Team	Pld	W	L	D	SD	Pts
Bengaluru Bulls (C)	22	13	7	2	104	78
Bengal Warriors	22	12	8	2	2	69
UP Yoddha	22	8	10	4	-45	57
Patna Pirates	22	9	11	2	-36	55
Telugu Titans	22	8	13	1	-55	51
Tamil Thalaivas	22	5	13	4	-70	42

Source: ProKabaddi

- advanced to Qualifier 1
- advanced to Eliminators
- Five points for a win
- Three points each for a drawn game
- One point for a loss by 7 points or fewer
- Top three teams from each zone qualify for the playoffs

=== Season VII ===
Team	Pld	W	L	D	SD	Pts
Dabang Delhi KC (R)	22	15	4	3	66	85
Bengal Warriors (C)	22	14	5	3	71	83
UP Yoddha	22	13	7	2	9	74
U Mumba	22	12	8	2	47	72
Haryana Steelers	22	13	8	1	15	71
Bengaluru Bulls	22	11	10	1	16	64
Jaipur Pink Panthers	22	9	11	2	-13	58
Patna Pirates	22	8	13	1	29	51
Gujarat Forunte Giants	22	7	13	2	18	51
Puneri Paltan	22	7	12	3	-72	48
Telugu Titans	22	6	13	3	-67	45
Tamil Thalaivas	22	4	15	3	-119	37

Source: ProKabaddi

- advanced to Finals
- advanced to Eliminators
- Five points for a win
- Three points each for a drawn game
- One point for a loss by 7 points or fewer
- Top 6 teams qualify for the playoffs

=== Season VIII ===
Pos	Team	Pld	W	L	T	SD	Pts	
1	Patna Pirates (R)	22	16	5	1	120	86	Qualification to semi finals
2	Dabang Delhi (C)	22	12	6	4	-3	75	Qualification to semi finals
3	UP Yoddha	22	10	9	3	33	68	Qualification to eliminators
4	Gujarat Giants	22	10	8	4	2	67	Qualification to eliminators
5	Bengaluru Bulls	22	11	9	2	53	66	Qualification to eliminators
6	Puneri Paltan	22	12	9	1	33	66	Qualification to eliminators
7	Haryana Steelers	22	10	9	3	-28	64	
8	Jaipur Pink Panthers	22	10	10	2	14	63	
9	Bengal Warriors	22	9	10	3	-18	57	
10	U Mumba	22	7	10	5	-34	55	
11	Tamil Thalaivas	22	5	11	6	-42	47	
12	Telugu Titans	22	1	17	4	-130	27	

Updated to match(es) played on 25 February 2022. Source: ProKabaddi
(C) Champion; (R) Runners Up
- Five points for a win
- Three points each for a drawn game
- One point for a loss by 7 points or fewer

=== Season IX ===
Pos	Team	Pld	W	L	T	SD	Pts	
1	Jaipur Pink Panthers (C)	22	15	6	1	174	82	Qualification to semi finals
2	Puneri Paltan (R)	22	14	6	2	66	80	Qualification to semi finals
3	Bengaluru Bulls	22	13	8	1	39	74	Qualification to eliminators
4	UP Yoddha	22	12	8	2	42	71	Qualification to eliminators
5	Tamil Thalaivas	22	10	8	4	5	66	Qualification to eliminators
6	Dabang Delhi	22	10	10	2	17	63	Qualification to eliminators
7	Haryana Steelers	22	10	10	2	16	61	
8	Gujarat Giants	22	9	11	2	-16	59	
9	U Mumba	22	10	12	0	-28	56	
10	Patna Pirates	22	8	11	3	-58	54	
11	Bengal Warriors	22	8	11	3	-12	53	
12	Telugu Titans	22	2	20	0	-245	15	

Source: ProKabaddi
(C) Champion; (R) Runners Up
- 5 points for a win
- 3 points for a tied game
- 1 point for a loss by 7 points or fewer

=== Season X ===
Pos	Team	Pld	W	L	T	SD	Pts	
1	Puneri Paltan (C)	22	17	2	3	253	96	Qualification to semi finals
2	Jaipur Pink Panthers	22	16	3	3	141	92	Qualification to semi finals
3	Dabang Delhi	22	13	6	3	53	79	Qualification to eliminators
4	Gujarat Giants	22	13	9	0	32	70	Qualification to eliminators
5	Haryana Steelers (R)	22	13	8	1	-13	70	Qualification to eliminators
6	Patna Pirates	22	11	8	3	50	69	Qualification to eliminators
7	Bengal Warriors	22	9	11	2	-43	55	
8	Bengaluru Bulls	22	8	12	2	-67	53	
9	Tamil Thalaivas	22	9	13	0	32	51	
10	U Mumba	22	6	13	3	-79	45	
11	UP Yoddhas	22	4	17	1	-116	31	
12	Telugu Titans	22	2	19	1	-243	21	

Source: ProKabaddi
Rules for classification:
- 5 points for a win
- 3 points for a tied game
- 1 point for a loss by 7 points or fewer
(C) Champion; (R) Runners Up

=== Season XI ===
Pos	Team	Pld	W	L	T	SD	Pts	
1	Haryana Steelers (C)	22	16	6	0	112	84	Qualification to semi finals
2	Dabang Delhi	22	13	5	4	85	81	Qualification to semi finals
3	UP Yoddhas	22	13	6	3	97	79	Qualification to eliminators
4	Patna Pirates (R)	22	13	7	2	93	77	Qualification to eliminators
5	U Mumba	22	12	8	2	16	71	Qualification to eliminators
6	Jaipur Pink Panthers	22	12	8	2	55	70	Qualification to eliminators
7	Telugu Titans	22	12	10	0	-40	66	
8	Puneri Paltan	22	9	10	3	61	60	
9	Tamil Thalaivas	22	8	13	1	16	50	
10	Bengal Warriorz	22	5	14	3	-116	41	
11	Gujarat Giants	22	5	14	3	-152	38	
12	Bengaluru Bulls	22	2	19	1	-227	19	

Source: ProKabaddi
Rules for classification:
- 5 points for a win
- 3 points for a tied game
- 1 point for a loss by 7 points or fewer
(C) Champion; (R) Runners up

=== Season XII ===
Pos	Team	Pld	W	L	SD	Pts	
1	Puneri Paltan (R)	18	13	5	88	26	Qualified for Qualifiers
2	Dabang Delhi K.C. (C)	18	13	5	38	26	Qualified for Qualifiers
3	Bengaluru Bulls	18	11	7	97	22	Qualified for Mini-qualifier
4	Telugu Titans	18	10	8	45	20	Qualified for Mini-qualifier
5	Haryana Steelers	18	10	8	40	20	Qualified for Play-ins
6	U Mumba	18	10	8	8	20	Qualified for Play-ins
7	Patna Pirates	18	8	10	12	16	Qualified for Play-ins
8	Jaipur Pink Panthers	18	8	10	-48	16	Qualified for Play-ins
9	UP Yoddhas	18	7	11	-65	14	
10	Tamil Thalaivas	18	6	12	-36	12	
11	Gujarat Giants	18	6	12	-73	12	
12	Bengal Warriorz	18	6	12	-106	12	

Source: ProKabaddi
Rules for classification:
- 2 points for a win
- 0 point for a loss
(C) Champion; (R) Runners up

== Records ==
=== Overall results Pro Kabaddi season ===
Seasons	Total	Wins	Losses	Tied	% Win	Position
Season 1	14	5	8	1	35.71%	6
Season 2	14	4	9	1	28.57%	6
Season 3	14	1	12	1	7.14%	8
Season 4	14	4	9	1	28.57%	7
Season 5	22	5	16	1	22.72%	6
Season 6	24	12	10	2	50%	3
Season 7	24	16	5	3	66.66%	Runners-up
Season 8	24	14	6	4	58.33%	Champions
Season 9	23	10	11	2	43.47%	Eliminator
Season 10	23	13	7	3	56.52%	Eliminator
Season 11						Semifinal
Season 12	20	15	5		75%	Champions

=== By opposition ===
Note: Table lists in alphabetical order.

Opposition	Played	Won	Lost	Drawn	% Win
Bengal Warriors	23	10	9	4	43.4%
Bengaluru Bulls	24	12	10	2	50.0%
Gujarat Fortune Giants	15	6	6	3	40.0%
Haryana Steelers	16	7	9	0	43.7%
Jaipur Pink Panthers	24	9	12	3	37.5%
Patna Pirates	22	9	10	3	40.9%
Puneri Paltan	24	9	12	3	37.5%
Tamil Thalaivas	12	8	2	2	66.6%
Telugu Titans	20	11	8	1	55.0%
U Mumba	24	10	13	1	41.6%
UP Yoddha	13	5	7	1	38.4%
Total	217	96	98	23	44.2%

== Sponsors ==
Year	Season	Kit Manufacturer	Main Sponsor	Back Sponsor	Sleeve Sponsor
2014	I	Shiv-Naresh	Reliance Group	Jaypee Cement	Jaypee Cement
2015	II	TYKA	Red Chief Shoes	Manipal Hospitals	Gaurs
2016	III	TYKA	Jaypee Group	Holiday Inn	Uber
2016	IV	TYKA		Fortis	Creambell
2017	V	TYKA	ISDI	ISME	DICE Academy
2018	VI		Awfis	DoIT Sports	ART
2019	VII	Reforce	JK Super Cement	ISME	Officer's Choice
2021	VIII	Shiv-Naresh	JK Super Cement	Vision11	Herbalife Nutrition
2022	IX	Shiv-Naresh	JK Super Cement	Vision11	DafaNews
2023	X	Omtex	Fun88 News	Red Chief	MyMaster11
2024	XI	SIX5SIX			
2025	XII	Amra	Valvoline	Technosport	ART
