= Borosil =

Indian glassware company based in Mumbai

- Type: Public
- Traded as: BSE: 543212; NSE: BOROLTD
- ISIN: INE666D01022
- Industry: Houseware
- Founded: 1962; 64 years ago
- Headquarters: 1101, Parinee Crescenzo, G-Block, Bandra Kurla Complex, Bandra (East), Mumbai, Maharashtra, India
- Area served: Worldwide
- Key people: Shreevar Kheruka (MD & CEO); B.L. Kheruka (Chairman)
- Revenue: ₹619.76 crore (US$64 million) (FY17)
- Owners: Kheruka family (54.35%)
- Website: borosil.com

Borosil is an Indian glassware company based in Mumbai. The company is one of the largest glassware-producing companies in India, with a presence in the United States and the Netherlands.

== History ==
Borosil primarily manufactures laboratory glassware and microwavable kitchenware in India. It was established in 1962 in collaboration with Corning Glass Works. In 1988, Corning divested its shareholding to the current Indian promoters.

== Products ==
The company's products include laboratory glassware, instruments, disposable plastics, liquid handling systems and explosion-proof lighting glassware for the education sector and for industries including microbiology, biotechnology, photoprinting, process systems and lighting.
