= TYKA Sports =

Indian brand of sportswear and sports equipment

- Industry: Sports wear, accessories
- Founded: 2009; 17 years ago
- Headquarters: Jalandhar, Punjab, India
- Area served: Worldwide
- Key people: Rajan Kohli (MD), Sonal Kohli
- Products: Athletic footwear and apparel, sport equipment and other athletic and recreational products
- Number of employees: Over 100
- Website: www.tyka.com

TYKA is an Indian sportswear and sports equipment brand introduced by TK Sports Private Limited in 2009. Primarily being the kit partner for various cricket teams across the world, TYKA is now associated with various football teams.

The company was incorporated on March 18, 2011. TYKA entered the market in 2014 when they were announced as the sports manufacture sponsor of Indian Super League side, Chennaiyin FC. TYKA have also made their way into the cricket market, being the official apparel sponsor of Indian Premier League sides Sunrisers Hyderabad. TYKA also sponsors the United Arab Emirates national cricket team.

== Teams ==
=== Cricket ===
==== International ====
- United Arab Emirates National Cricket Team

==== Domestic Clubs ====
===== Caribbean Premier League =====
- Guyana Amazon Warriors
- (Saint Kitts and Nevis) St Kitts and Nevis Patriots

===== Hong Kong T20 Blitz =====
- (Hong Kong) Galaxy Gladiators Lantau

===== Karnataka Premier League =====
- (India) Mysuru Warriors
- (India) Shivamogga Lions
- (India) Bijapur Bulls

===== Tamil Nadu Premier League =====
- (India) Chepauk Super Gillies
- (India) Siechem Madurai Panthers

===== T20 Mumbai League =====
- (India) ARCH Andheri
- (India) North Mumbai Panthers

===== Celebrity Cricket League =====
- (India) Bengal Tigers

===== English Cricket County =====
- (England) Somerset County Cricket Club
- (England) Werrington Cricket Club
- (England) Bexleyheath Cricket Club
- (England) Western Storm

===== Clubs in Scotland =====
- (Scotland) Galloway C. C.

===== Cricket clubs in America =====
- (United States) Atlantic Eagles Cricket Club
- (United States) AGCC
- (United States) Atlantic Paramveers
- (United States) Bay Area Cricket Alliance
- (United States) Bazooka Cricket
- (United States) Delaware Blue Hens Cricket Club
- (United States) Cardinal Hollywood C. C.
- (United States) Corinthian C. C.
- (United States) Crescent C. C.
- (United States) Intermountain Cricket League (Utah)
- (United States) Inland Empire C. C.
- (United States) Jersey Knights Cricket Club (New Jersey)
- (United States) Lehigh Valley C. C.
- (United States) North California Cricket Association
- (United States) Stanford University Cricket Club
- (United States) Santa Clara C. C.
- (United States) Utah All Star C. C.

===== Clubs in Australia =====
- (Australia) Ashburton Willows C. C.
- (Australia) Ascot Eagle Junior C. C.
- (Australia) Bulls University C. C.
- (Australia) Beacon Hill C.C.
- (Australia) Donnybrook C. C.
- (Australia) Hills Rangers F. C.
- (Australia) De La Salle F. C.
- (Australia) Kew C. C.
- (Australia) Parkdale C. C.
- (Australia) Shane Warne Foundation
- (Australia) WGCC

===== Indian domestic associations =====
- (India) Bihar Cricket Association
- (India) Chhattisgarh State Cricket Sangh
- (India) Cricket Association of Bengal
- (India) Goa Cricket Association
- (India) Kerala Cricket Association
- (India) Madhya Pradesh Cricket Association
- (India) National Cricket Academy
- (India) Odisha Cricket Association
- Sports Authority of India
- (India) Vidarbha Cricket Association

===== Indian corporates and government organizations =====
- (India) Indian Air Force
- (India) Indian Audit and Accounts Service
- (India) ONGC
- (India) Punjab National Bank
- (India) Reliance Industries

===== Indian universities and schools =====
- (India) BITS Pilani
- (India) IIT Bombay
- (India) Kasiga School
- (India) Kodaikanal International School
- (India) Mangalore Institute of Technology And Engineering
- (India) Modern School (New Delhi)
- (India) NMIMS Shirpur
- (India) PES University
- (India) Punjabi University
- (India) Welham Boys' School

===== Kingdom Of Saudi Arabia (Corporate Club Teams) =====
Bupa Arabia Cricket Tournament

=== Football ===
==== Clubs ====
- (India) SC East Bengal (2020)
- (India) Delhi Dynamos FC (2018–2019)
- (India) Odisha FC (2019—2020)
- (India) Chennaiyin FC (2014–2015)
- (India) Indian Super League - referee and crew clothing in 2015 season
- (India) U Dream Football by Unilazer Sports (Ronnie Screwvala)

=== Kabaddi ===
==== Clubs ====
- (India) Bengal Warriors (2014–)
- (India) Dabang Delhi (2014–)
- (India) Jaipur Pink Panthers (2014–2015)
- (India) U Mumba (2014–2015)

=== Shooting ===
- (India) Indian National Shooting Team

=== Squash ===
- Squash Rackets Federation of India
