= 2018 Tamil Thalaivas season =

- Sport: Kabaddi
- League: PKL
- Location: Chennai, Tamil Nadu, India
- Stadium: Jawaharlal Nehru Stadium (Capacity: 8,000)
- Head coach: (India) E Baskaran
- Captain: (India) Ajay Thakur

The 2018 Tamil Thalaivas season is the second season of the Tamil Thalaivas' existence in the Pro Kabaddi League. The team is currently led by Ajay Thakur and coached by E Baskaran. Tamil Thalaivas play their home matches at the Jawaharlal Nehru Stadium (Chennai), Tamil Nadu.

== Review ==
Tamil Thalaivas announced Edachery Bhaskaran as their new head coach. Kasinatha Baskaran, who had been at the helm of affairs in the previous season, will move into the role of Technical Director - Strategic Grassroot Program of the franchise.

Tamil Thalaivas retained the core in form of Ajay Thakur, Amit Hooda and C Arun along with D. Pratap as a new young player, ahead of the auction.

Sukesh Hegde and Darshan J were also purchased by the franchise at an identical amount of Rs 28 Lakh. All-rounder Manjeet Chillar was also picked up by the Thalaivas for Rs. 20 Lakhs. While Rajnish, and Anand join the team as new young players.

Thalaivas managed to pick up a lot of players on their base price, snapping up a number of bargain buys in the process. South Korean duo Chan Sik Park and Jae Min Lee were two such players.

== Current squad ==
| Jersey No | Name | Nationality | Position | Previous Team | Price |
|---|---|---|---|---|---|
| - | K.Prapanjan | (India) | Raider | Bengal Warriors | 71 lacs |
| - | Manjeet | (India) | Raider | Puneri Paltan | 92 lakhs |
| - | Bhavani Rajput | (India) | Raider | Tamil Thalaivas | 10 lakhs |
| - | Ajinkiya Ashok Pawar | (India) | Raider | Jaipur Pink Panthers | 19.5 lakhs |
| - | Athul MS | (India) | Raider | U Mumba | 30 lakhs |
| - | Sourabh Tanaji Patil | (India) | All-Rounder | Bengal Warriors | 15 lakhs |
| - | Sagar B.Krishna | (India) | All-Rounder | Puneri Paltan | 10 lakhs |
| - | Santhapanaselvam | (India) | All-Rounder | Jaipur Pink Panthers | 10 lakhs |
| - | Anwar Saheed Baba | (Sri Lanka) | All-Rounder | - | 10 lakhs |
| - | Surjeet Singh | (India) | Defender, Right Cover | Puneri Paltan | 75 lakhs |
| - | Mohammad Tuhin Tarafder | (Bangladesh) | Defender, Right Cover | - | 10 lakhs |
| - | Sahil | (India) | Defender, Right Cover | - | 10 lakhs |
| - | Himanshu | (India) | Defender, Left Corner | Retained | - |
| - | M.Abhishek | (India) | Defender, Right Cover | Retained | - |
| - | Sagar | (India) | Defender, Right Corner | Retained | - |
Source: Pro Kabaddi

== Sponsors ==
Tamil Thalaivas announced Muthoot Fincorp India will be the Official Title Sponsor for Season 5, 2017. Powered by Maha Cement, Associate sponsors are Agni Steels, Nippon Paints, Smartron and Admiral Sportswear

| Year | Edition | Season | Kit Manufacturers | Shirt Sponsor |
|---|---|---|---|---|
| 2018 | October | VI | | |
