= 2024 Pro Kabaddi League =

11th Season of Pro Kabaddi League

2024 Pro Kabaddi League Season 11

Tournament information
- Dates: 18 October 2024–29 December 2024
- Administrator: Mashal Sports
- Tournament format(s): Double round robin and playoffs
- Host: India
- Teams: 12
- Website: Pro Kabaddi

Final positions
- Champion: Haryana Steelers (1st title)
- Runner-up: Patna Pirates

Tournament statistics
- Matches played: 137
- Top scorer: (India) Devank Dalal (301) (Patna Pirates)
- Most tackle points: (Iran) Mohammadreza Chiyaneh (82) (Haryana Steelers)
- Most successful raids: (India) Devank Dalal (226) (Patna Pirates)
- Most successful tackles: (Iran) Mohammadreza Chiyaneh (78) (Haryana Steelers)

The 2024 Pro Kabaddi League was the eleventh season of the Pro Kabaddi League, a franchise-based Kabaddi league in India. The league matches of this season started on October 18.

Puneri Paltan were the defending champions, who won their maiden PKL title, beating Haryana Steelers in the previous edition.

Haryana Steelers became the champions for the maiden time after finishing as runners-up in the last season. They defeated three-time champions Patna Pirates to clinch the title. Thus, the Steelers became the first-ever team to be founded in 2017 and win the title. The final took place at the Shree Shiv Chhatrapati Sports Complex Wrestling Hall in Pune in front of a capacity crowd of 4,400.

On 28 December 2024, one day before the 2024 Pro Kabaddi League Final, the Pro Kabaddi League hosted the Pro Kabaddi League: Melbourne Raid at the John Cain Arena in Melbourne, Victoria, Australia. The event featured two Kabaddi All Star Exhibition matches.

== Participating teams ==
Locations of the Pro Kabaddi teams

The same 12 teams from the previous season returned with few changes to the team personnel.

Teams	Head coach	Captain
Bengal Warriorz	(India) Prashant Surve	(Iran) Fazel Atrachali
Bengaluru Bulls	(India) Randhir Singh Sehrawat	(India) Pardeep Narwal
Dabang Delhi K.C.	(India) Joginder Narwal	(India) Naveen Kumar
Gujarat Giants	(India) Ram Mehar Singh	(India) Neeraj Kumar
Haryana Steelers	(India) Manpreet Singh	(India) Jaideep Dahiya
Jaipur Pink Panthers	(India) Sanjeev Kumar Baliyan	(India) Arjun Deshwal
Patna Pirates	(India) Narender Kumar Redhu	(India) Shubham Shinde
Puneri Paltan	(India) BC Ramesh	(India) Aslam Inamdar
Tamil Thalaivas	(India) J.Udayakumar & Dharmaraj Cheralathan	(India) Sagar Rathee
Telugu Titans	(India) Krishan Kumar	(India) Pawan Sehrawat
U Mumba	(Iran) Gholamreza	(India) Sunil Kumar
UP Yoddha	(India) Jasveer Singh	(India) Surender Gill

== Venues ==
This time, the league will be played in three venues: Hyderabad, Noida and Pune respectively.

Stadium	Location	Capacity	Dates
League Stage
Gachibowli Indoor Stadium	Hyderabad, Telangana	5,000	18 October–9 November
Noida Indoor Stadium	Noida, Uttar Pradesh	5,000	10 November–1 December
Badminton Hall in Balewadi Sports Complex	Pune, Maharashtra	4,200	3 December–24 December

== Points Table ==
Pos	Team	Pld	W	L	T	SD	Pts	
1	Haryana Steelers (C)	22	16	6	0	112	84	Qualification to semi finals
2	Dabang Delhi	22	13	5	4	85	81	Qualification to semi finals
3	UP Yoddhas	22	13	6	3	97	79	Qualification to eliminators
4	Patna Pirates (R)	22	13	7	2	93	77	Qualification to eliminators
5	U Mumba	22	12	8	2	16	71	Qualification to eliminators
6	Jaipur Pink Panthers	22	12	8	2	55	70	Qualification to eliminators
7	Telugu Titans	22	12	10	0	-40	66	
8	Puneri Paltan	22	9	10	3	61	60	
9	Tamil Thalaivas	22	8	13	1	16	50	
10	Bengal Warriorz	22	5	14	3	-116	41	
11	Gujarat Giants	22	5	14	3	-152	38	
12	Bengaluru Bulls	22	2	19	1	-227	19	

Source: ProKabaddi
Rules for classification:
- 5 points for a win
- 3 points for a tied game
- 1 point for a loss by 7 points or fewer
(C) Champion; (R) Runners up

== League Stage ==
=== Form ===
Team ╲ Round	1	2	3	4	5	6	7	8	9	10	11	12	13	14	15	16	17	18	19	20	21	22
Bengal Warriorz	L	W	T	T	W	L	W	L	L	L	L	L	L	L	W	L	W	T	L	L	L	L
Bengaluru Bulls	L	L	L	L	W	L	W	L	L	L	L	L	L	L	L	T	L	L	L	L	L	L
Dabang Delhi	W	L	W	L	L	L	L	W	W	T	W	T	W	T	W	T	W	W	W	W	W	W
Gujarat Giants	W	L	L	L	L	L	L	L	W	L	T	W	W	L	T	L	W	L	L	L	T	L
Haryana Steelers	L	W	W	W	L	W	W	W	W	W	L	W	W	W	W	L	W	W	W	L	L	W
Jaipur Pink Panthers	W	W	L	T	L	W	L	W	W	W	L	L	W	L	W	T	L	W	W	W	W	L
Patna Pirates	L	W	L	W	W	L	W	W	L	W	W	L	T	W	W	L	W	W	W	W	L	T
Puneri Paltan	W	W	L	W	T	W	W	L	T	L	T	W	L	L	W	L	L	L	W	L	L	W
Tamil Thalaivas	W	W	L	T	W	L	L	L	L	W	L	L	W	L	L	W	L	L	L	W	W	L
Telugu Titans	W	L	L	L	W	W	W	W	L	W	W	W	L	W	L	L	W	L	L	W	L	W
U Mumba	L	W	T	W	L	W	W	W	L	W	W	L	W	L	W	T	L	W	L	W	L	W
UP Yoddhas	W	W	L	W	L	L	L	L	W	T	W	W	L	W	W	T	W	T	W	W	W	W

Updated to match(es) played on 24 December 2024. Source:
W = Win; L = Lose; T = Tie

=== Leg 1 – Gachibowli Indoor Stadium, Hyderabad ===
Match 1
18 October 2024
20:00 (IST)

Telugu Titans	37 – 29	Bengaluru Bulls
Pawan Sehrawat (13)	Result	Jatin (3)

Telugu Titans won

Match 2
18 October 2024
21:00 (IST)

Dabang Delhi K.C.	36 – 28	U Mumba
Ashu Malik (10)	Result	Ajit Chavan (10)

Dabang Delhi K.C. won

Match 3
19 October 2024
20:00 (IST)

Telugu Titans	29 – 44	Tamil Thalaivas
Pawan Sehrawat (10)	Result	Sachin Tanwar (10)

Tamil Thalaivas won

Match 4
19 October 2024
21:00 (IST)

Puneri Paltan	35 – 25	Haryana Steelers
Aslam Inamdar (5)	Result	Shivam Patare (5)

Puneri Paltan won

Match 5
20 October 2024
20:00 (IST)

Bengal Warriorz	34 – 39	Jaipur Pink Panthers
Nitin Dhankhar (13)	Result	Arjun Deshwal (15)

Jaipur Pink Panthers won

Match 6
20 October 2024
21:00 (IST)

Gujarat Giants	36 – 32	Bengaluru Bulls
Parteek Dahiya (8)	Result	Pardeep Narwal (9)

Gujarat Giants won

Match 7
21 October 2024
20:00 (IST)

UP Yoddhas	28 – 23	Dabang Delhi K.C.
Bhavani Rajput (7)	Result	Naveen Kumar (4)

UP Yoddhas won

Match 8
21 October 2024
21:00 (IST)

Puneri Paltan	40 – 25	Patna Pirates
Aslam Inamdar (9)	Result	Devank (6)

Puneri Paltan won

Match 9
22 October 2024
20:00 (IST)

Telugu Titans	22 – 52	Jaipur Pink Panthers
Pawan Sehrawat (7)	Result	Arjun Deshwal (19)

Jaipur Pink Panthers won

Match 10
22 October 2024
21:00 (IST)

UP Yoddhas	57 – 36	Bengaluru Bulls
Surender Gill (17)	Result	Pardeep Narwal (16)

UP Yoddhas won

Match 11
23 October 2024
20:00 (IST)

Tamil Thalaivas	35 – 30	Puneri Paltan
Narender Kandola (9)	Result	Mohit Goyat (13)

Tamil Thalaivas won

Match 12
23 October 2024
21:00 (IST)

Gujarat Giants	27 – 33	U Mumba
Parteek Dahiya (5)	Result	Amirmohammad Zafardanesh (10)

U Mumba won

Match 13
24 October 2024
20:00 (IST)

Bengal Warriorz	32 – 29	UP Yoddhas
Maninder Singh (8)	Result	Bharat (13)

Bengal Warriorz won

Match 14
24 October 2024
21:00 (IST)

Haryana Steelers	37 – 25	Jaipur Pink Panthers
Vinay (10)	Result	Abhijeet Malik (6)

Haryana Steelers won

Match 15
25 October 2024
20:00 (IST)

Patna Pirates	42 – 40	Tamil Thalaivas
Devank (25)	Result	Narender Kandola (15)

Patna Pirates won

Match 16
25 October 2024
21:00 (IST)

Bengaluru Bulls	22 – 36	Puneri Paltan
Pankaj (6)	Result	Mohit Goyat (6)

Puneri Paltan won

Match 17
26 October 2024
20:00 (IST)

U Mumba	31 – 31	Bengal Warriorz
Manjeet (7)	Result	Maninder Singh (8)

Match tied

Match 18
26 October 2024
21:00 (IST)

Telugu Titans	37 – 41	Dabang Delhi K.C.
Pawan Sehrawat (18)	Result	Naveen Kumar (15)

Dabang Delhi K.C. won

Match 19
27 October 2024
20:00 (IST)

Jaipur Pink Panthers	30 – 30	Tamil Thalaivas
Arjun Deshwal (7)	Result	Sachin Tanwar (11)

Match tied

Match 20
27 October 2024
21:00 (IST)

UP Yoddhas	35 – 29	Gujarat Giants
Bharat (13)	Result	Rakesh (8)

UP Yoddhas won

Match 21
28 October 2024
20:00 (IST)

Haryana Steelers	41 – 34	Dabang Delhi K.C.
Shivam Patare (8)	Result	Ashu Malik (13)

Haryana Steelers won

Match 22
28 October 2024
21:00 (IST)

Telugu Titans	28 – 26	Patna Pirates
Ashish Narwal (9)	Result	Devank (7)

Telugu Titans won

Match 23
29 October 2024
20:00 (IST)

Bengal Warriorz	32 – 32	Puneri Paltan
Sushil Kambrekar (10)	Result	Akash Shinde (8)

Match tied

Match 24
29 October 2024
21:00 (IST)

Bengaluru Bulls	34 – 33	Dabang Delhi K.C.
Pardeep Narwal (7)	Result	Ashu Malik (13)

Bengaluru Bulls won

Match 25
30 October 2024
20:00 (IST)

Gujarat Giants	25 – 44	Tamil Thalaivas
Guman Singh (7)	Result	Narender Kandola (15)

Tamil Thalaivas won

Match 26
30 October 2024
21:00 (IST)

UP Yoddhas	28 – 30	Haryana Steelers
Gagan Gowda (9)	Result	Vinay (8)

Haryana Steelers won

Match 27
31 October 2024
20:00 (IST)

Patna Pirates	44 – 30	Dabang Delhi K.C.
Devank (12)	Result	Vinay (10)

Patna Pirates won

Match 28
31 October 2024
21:00 (IST)

U Mumba	39 – 37	Jaipur Pink Panthers
Ajit Chavan (14)	Result	Neeraj Narwal (12)

U Mumba won

Match 29
2 November 2024
20:00 (IST)

UP Yoddhas	37 – 42	Patna Pirates
Gagan Gowda (9)	Result	Devank (11)

Patna Pirates won

Match 30
2 November 2024
21:00 (IST)

Bengaluru Bulls	35 – 38	Telugu Titans
Ajinkya Pawar (9)	Result	Pawan Sehrawat (14)

Telugu Titans won

Match 31
3 November 2024
20:00 (IST)

Bengal Warriorz	40 – 38	Haryana Steelers
Maninder Singh (12)	Result	Vinay (10)

Bengal Warriorz won

Match 32
3 November 2024
21:00 (IST)

Puneri Paltan	35 – 28	U Mumba
Aslam Inamdar (10)	Result	Ajit Chavan (9)

Puneri Paltan won

Match 33
4 November 2024
20:00 (IST)

Puneri Paltan	49 – 30	Gujarat Giants
Akash Shinde (11)	Result	Guman Singh (12)

Puneri Paltan won

Match 34
4 November 2024
21:00 (IST)

Bengaluru Bulls	36 – 32	Tamil Thalaivas
Akshit (6)	Result	Narender Kandola (6)

Bengaluru Bulls won

Match 35
5 November 2024
20:00 (IST)

Jaipur Pink Panthers	33 – 30	UP Yoddhas
Neeraj Narwal (9)	Result	Bharat (7)

Jaipur Pink Panthers won

Match 36
5 November 2024
21:00 (IST)

U Mumba	32 – 26	Dabang Delhi K.C.
Manjeet (9)	Result	Ashu Malik (11)

U Mumba won

Match 37
6 November 2024
20:00 (IST)

Patna Pirates	40 – 42	U Mumba
Devank (15)	Result	Ajit Chavan (19)

U Mumba won

Match 38
6 November 2024
21:00 (IST)

Tamil Thalaivas	34 – 35	Telugu Titans
Sachin (17)	Result	Pawan Sehrawat (12)

Telugu Titans won

Match 39
7 November 2024
20:00 (IST)

Bengal Warriorz	30 – 33	Dabang Delhi K.C.
Nitin Kumar (15)	Result	Ashu Malik (10)

Dabang Delhi K.C. won

Match 40
7 November 2024
21:00 (IST)

Haryana Steelers	35 – 22	Gujarat Giants
Vinay (9)	Result	Guman Singh (11)

Haryana Steelers won

Match 41
8 November 2024
20:00 (IST)

Jaipur Pink Panthers	41 – 43	Patna Pirates
Arjun Deshwal (20)	Result	Ayan (14)

Patna Pirates won

Match 42
8 November 2024
21:00 (IST)

Dabang Delhi K.C.	39 – 26	Tamil Thalaivas
Ashu Malik (12)	Result	Narender Kandola (6)

Dabang Delhi K.C. won

Match 43
9 November 2024
20:00 (IST)

Telugu Titans	34 – 33	Puneri Paltan
Pawan Sehrawat (12)	Result	Pankaj Mohite (9)

Telugu Titans won

Match 44
9 November 2024
21:00 (IST)

Bengaluru Bulls	29 – 40	Bengal Warriorz
Akshit (11)	Result	Nitin Kumar (14)

Bengal Warriorz won

=== Leg 2 – Noida Indoor Stadium, Noida ===
Match 45
10 November 2024
20:00 (IST)

UP Yoddhas	33 – 35	U Mumba
Bharat (11)	Result	Ajit Chouhan (8)

U Mumba won

Match 46
10 November 2024
21:00 (IST)

Gujarat Giants	23 – 39	Haryana Steelers
Rakesh (7)	Result	Vinay (7)

Haryana Steelers won

Match 47
11 November 2024
20:00 (IST)

Gujarat Giants	27 – 40	Patna Pirates
Guman Singh (5)	Result	Ayan (10)

Patna Pirates won

Match 48
11 November 2024
21:00 (IST)

U Mumba	39 – 48	Haryana Steelers
Ajit Chouhan (18)	Result	Shivam Patare (11)

Haryana Steelers won

Match 49
12 November 2024
20:00 (IST)

Bengaluru Bulls	32 – 39	Jaipur Pink Panthers
Ajinkya Pawar (9)	Result	Arjun Deshwal (19)

Jaipur Pink Panthers won

Match 50
12 November 2024
21:00 (IST)

Dabang Delhi K.C.	38 – 38	Puneri Paltan
Ashu Malik (17)	Result	Akash Shinde (8)

Match tied

Match 51
13 November 2024
20:00 (IST)

Gujarat Giants	47 – 28	Bengal Warriorz
Guman Singh (17)	Result	Nitin Kumar (11)

Gujarat Giants won

Match 52
13 November 2024
21:00 (IST)

Patna Pirates	32 – 37	Haryana Steelers
Devank (7)	Result	Vinay (6)

Haryana Steelers won

Match 53
14 November 2024
20:00 (IST)

UP Yoddhas	40 – 34	Telugu Titans
Bhawani Rajput (12)	Result	Vijay Malik (15)

UP Yoddhas won

Match 54
14 November 2024
21:00 (IST)

Tamil Thalaivas	32 – 35	U Mumba
Moein Safaghi (10)	Result	Manjeet (10)

U Mumba won

Match 55
15 November 2024
20:00 (IST)

Patna Pirates	52 – 31	Bengal Warriorz
Devank (15)	Result	Nitin Kumar (11)

Patna Pirates won

Match 56
15 November 2024
21:00 (IST)

Jaipur Pink Panthers	32 – 24	Gujarat Giants
Arjun Deshwal (9)	Result	Guman Singh (11)

Jaipur Pink Panthers won

Match 57
16 November 2024
20:00 (IST)

Bengal Warriorz	31 – 46	Tamil Thalaivas
Vishwas S (9)	Result	Vishal Chahal (12)

Tamil Thalaivas won

Match 58
16 November 2024
21:00 (IST)

Dabang Delhi K.C.	35 – 25	Bengaluru Bulls
Ashu Malik (14)	Result	Pardeep Narwal (5)

Dabang Delhi K.C. won

Match 59
17 November 2024
20:00 (IST)

Haryana Steelers	36 – 29	Tamil Thalaivas
Vinay (10)	Result	Narender Kandola (4)

Haryana Steelers won

Match 60
17 November 2024
21:00 (IST)

Jaipur Pink Panthers	30 – 28	Puneri Paltan
Arjun Deshwal (8)	Result	Akash Shinde (7)

Jaipur Pink Panthers won

Match 61
18 November 2024
20:00 (IST)

Telugu Titans	49 – 27	Haryana Steelers
Ashish Narwal (11)	Result	Jaya Soorya (5)

Telugu Titans won

Match 62
18 November 2024
21:00 (IST)

Bengaluru Bulls	37 – 38	U Mumba
Pardeep Narwal (10)	Result	Ajit Chouhan (10)

U Mumba won

Match 63
19 November 2024
20:00 (IST)

Puneri Paltan	29 – 29	UP Yoddhas
Pankaj Mohite (9)	Result	Bhavani Rajput (10)

Match tied

Match 64
19 November 2024
21:00 (IST)

Bengaluru Bulls	31 – 54	Patna Pirates
Akshit (7)	Result	Devank (16)

Patna Pirates won

Match 65
20 November 2024
20:00 (IST)

Dabang Delhi K.C.	39 – 39	Gujarat Giants
Ashu Malik (11)	Result	Parteek Dahiya (20)

Match tied

Match 66
20 November 2024
21:00 (IST)

Telugu Titans	31 – 29	U Mumba
Ashish Narwal (8)	Result	Manjeet (7)

Telugu Titans won

Match 67
21 November 2024
20:00 (IST)

Bengal Warriorz	29 – 31	Telugu Titans
Pranay Rane (9)	Result	Vijay Malik (14)

Telugu Titans won

Match 68
21 November 2024
21:00 (IST)

Bengaluru Bulls	26 – 32	Haryana Steelers
Akshit (7)	Result	Vinay (12)

Haryana Steelers won

Match 69
22 November 2024
20:00 (IST)

Tamil Thalaivas	24 – 40	UP Yoddhas
Vishal Chahal (6)	Result	Bhavani Rajput (10)

UP Yoddhas won

Match 70
22 November 2024
21:00 (IST)

Jaipur Pink Panthers	21 – 35	Dabang Delhi K.C.
Arjun Deshwal (7)	Result	Ashu Malik (9)

Dabang Delhi K.C. won

Match 71
23 November 2024
20:00 (IST)

Gujarat Giants	31 – 28	Telugu Titans
Parteek Dahiya (11)	Result	Vijay (15)

Gujarat Giants won

Match 72
23 November 2024
21:00 (IST)

Jaipur Pink Panthers	30 – 43	Haryana Steelers
Arjun Deshwal (16)	Result	Vinay (11)

Haryana Steelers won

Match 73
24 November 2024
20:00 (IST)

Puneri Paltan	51 – 34	Bengal Warriorz
Akash Shinde (9)	Result	Nitin Kumar (13)

Puneri Paltan won

Match 74
24 November 2024
21:00 (IST)

Patna Pirates	42 – 44	UP Yoddhas
Devank (18)	Result	Bhavani Rajput (10)

UP Yoddhas won

Match 75
25 November 2024
20:00 (IST)

Puneri Paltan	23 – 37	Jaipur Pink Panthers
Pankaj Mohite (7)	Result	Arjun Deshwal (16)

Jaipur Pink Panthers won

Match 76
25 November 2024
21:00 (IST)

U Mumba	34 – 32	Bengaluru Bulls
Manjeet (8)	Result	Sushil (8)

U Mumba won

Match 77
26 November 2024
20:00 (IST)

UP Yoddhas	26 – 40	Tamil Thalaivas
Gagan Gowda (8)	Result	Narender Kandola (6)

Tamil Thalaivas won

Match 78
26 November 2024
21:00 (IST)

Dabang Delhi K.C.	39 - 39	Patna Pirates
Ashu Malik (11)	Result	Devank (15)

Match tied

Match 79
27 November 2024
20:00 (IST)

Haryana Steelers	38 - 28	Puneri Paltan
TBA	Result	TBA

Haryana Steelers won

Match 80
27 November 2024
21:00 (IST)

Bengal Warriorz	37 - 39	Gujarat Giants
TBA	Result	TBA

Gujarat Giants won

Match 81
28 November 2024
20:00 (IST)

UP Yoddhas	33 - 29	Jaipur Pink Panthers
TBA	Result	TBA

UP Yoddhas won

Match 82
28 November 2024
21:00 (IST)

U Mumba	35 - 41	Telugu Titans
TBA	Result	TBA

Telugu Titans won

Match 83
29 November 2024
20:00 (IST)

Tamil Thalaivas	30 - 42	Haryana Steelers
TBA	Result	TBA

Haryana Steelers won

Match 84
29 November 2024
21:00 (IST)

Gujarat Giants	33 - 34	Puneri Paltan
TBA	Result	TBA

Puneri Paltan won

Match 85
30 November 2024
20:00 (IST)

Patna Pirates	54 - 29	Bengaluru Bulls
TBA	Result	TBA

Patna Pirates won

Match 86
30 November 2024
21:00 (IST)

Jaipur Pink Panthers	41 - 28	Telugu Titans
TBA	Result	TBA

Jaipur Pink Panthers won

Match 87
1 December 2024
20:00 (IST)

Tamil Thalaivas	21 - 32	Dabang Delhi K.C.
TBA	Result	TBA

Dabang Delhi K.C. won

Match 88
1 December 2024
21:00 (IST)

Bengal Warriorz	35 - 38	Patna Pirates
TBA	Result	TBA

Patna Pirates won

=== Leg 3 – Balewadi Sports Complex, Pune ===
Match 89
3 December 2024
20:00 (IST)

Bengaluru Bulls	34 - 34	Gujarat Giants
TBA	Result	TBA

Match tied

Match 90
3 December 2024
21:00 (IST)

U Mumba	43 - 29	Puneri Paltan
TBA	Result	TBA

U Mumba won

Match 91
4 December 2024
20:00 (IST)

Telugu Titans	33 - 36	UP Yoddhas
TBA	Result	TBA

UP Yoddhas won

Match 92
4 December 2024
21:00 (IST)

Haryana Steelers	32 - 39	Bengal Warriorz
TBA	Result	TBA

Bengal Warriorz won

Match 93
5 December 2024
20:00 (IST)

Dabang Delhi K.C.	32 - 32	UP Yoddhas
TBA	Result	TBA

Match tied

Match 94
5 December 2024
21:00 (IST)

Jaipur Pink Panthers	22 - 22	U Mumba
TBA	Result	TBA

Match tied

Match 95
6 December 2024
20:00 (IST)

Tamil Thalaivas	40 - 27	Gujarat Giants
TBA	Result	TBA

Tamil Thalaivas won

Match 96
6 December 2024
21:00 (IST)

Haryana Steelers	42 - 36	Patna Pirates
TBA	Result	TBA

Haryana Steelers won

Match 97
7 December 2024
20:00 (IST)

UP Yoddhas	36 - 33	Puneri Paltan
TBA	Result	TBA

UP Yoddhas won

Match 98
7 December 2024
21:00 (IST)

Telugu Titans	34 - 32	Bengal Warriorz
TBA	Result	TBA

Telugu Titans won

Match 99
8 December 2024
20:00 (IST)

Patna Pirates	38 - 28	Jaipur Pink Panthers
TBA	Result	TBA

Patna Pirates won

Match 100
8 December 2024
21:00 (IST)

U Mumba	33 - 34	Gujarat Giants
TBA	Result	TBA

U Mumba won

Match 101
9 December 2024
20:00 (IST)

Haryana Steelers	46 - 25	Telugu Titans
TBA	Result	TBA

Haryana Steelers won

Match 102
9 December 2024
21:00 (IST)

Puneri Paltan	26 - 30	Dabang Delhi K.C.
TBA	Result	TBA

Dabang Delhi K.C. won

Match 103
10 December 2024
20:00 (IST)

Gujarat Giants	29 - 42	Jaipur Pink Panthers
TBA	Result	TBA

Jaipur Pink Panthers won

Match 104
10 December 2024
21:00 (IST)

Bengal Warriorz	44 - 29	Bengaluru Bulls
TBA	Result	TBA

Bengal Warriorz won

Match 105
11 December 2024
20:00 (IST)

Haryana Steelers	37 - 26	Bengaluru Bulls
TBA	Result	TBA

Haryana Steelers won

Match 106
11 December 2024
21:00 (IST)

U Mumba	47 - 31	Tamil Thalaivas
TBA	Result	TBA

U Mumba won

Match 107
12 December 2024
20:00 (IST)

Dabang Delhi K.C.	33 - 27	Telugu Titans
TBA	Result	TBA

Dabang Delhi K.C. won

Match 108
12 December 2024
21:00 (IST)

UP Yoddhas	31 - 31	Bengal Warriorz
TBA	Result	TBA

Match tied

Match 109
13 December 2024
20:00 (IST)

Tamil Thalaivas	38 - 42	Patna Pirates
TBA	Result	TBA

Patna Pirates won

Match 110
13 December 2024
21:00 (IST)

Puneri Paltan	56 - 18	Bengaluru Bulls
TBA	Result	TBA

Puneri Paltan won

Match 111
14 December 2024
20:00 (IST)

Telugu Titans	36 - 32	Gujarat Giants
TBA	Result	TBA

Telugu Titans won

Match 112
14 December 2024
21:00 (IST)

Dabang Delhi K.C.	44 - 37	Haryana Steelers
TBA	Result	TBA

Dabang Delhi K.C. won

Match 113
15 December 2024
20:00 (IST)

Tamil Thalaivas	27 - 34	Jaipur Pink Panthers
TBA	Result	TBA

Jaipur Pink Panthers won

Match 114
15 December 2024
21:00 (IST)

U Mumba	27 - 30	UP Yoddhas
TBA	Result	TBA

UP Yoddhas won

Match 115
16 December 2024
20:00 (IST)

Dabang Delhi K.C.	47 - 25	Bengal Warriorz
TBA	Result	TBA

Dabang Delhi K.C. won

Match 116
16 December 2024
21:00 (IST)

Patna Pirates	37 - 32	Puneri Paltan
TBA	Result	TBA

Patna Pirates won

Match 117
17 December 2024
20:00 (IST)

Haryana Steelers	24 - 31	UP Yoddhas
TBA	Result	TBA

UP Yoddhas won

Match 118
17 December 2024
21:00 (IST)

Jaipur Pink Panthers	35 - 26	Bengaluru Bulls
TBA	Result	TBA

Jaipur Pink Panthers won

Match 119
18 December 2024
20:00 (IST)

Tamil Thalaivas	60 - 29	Bengal Warriorz
TBA	Result	TBA

Tamil Thalaivas won

Match 120
18 December 2024
21:00 (IST)

Patna Pirates	41 - 37	Telugu Titans
TBA	Result	TBA

Patna Pirates won

Match 121
19 December 2024
20:00 (IST)

Gujarat Giants	23 - 59	UP Yoddhas
TBA	Result	TBA

UP Yoddhas won

Match 122
19 December 2024
21:00 (IST)

U Mumba	43 - 37	Patna Pirates
TBA	Result	TBA

U Mumba won

Match 123
20 December 2024
20:00 (IST)

Jaipur Pink Panthers	31 - 28	Bengal Warriorz
TBA	Result	TBA

Jaipur Pink Panthers won

Match 124
20 December 2024
21:00 (IST)

Puneri Paltan	36 - 48	Telugu Titans
TBA	Result	TBA

Telugu Titans won

Match 125
21 December 2024
20:00 (IST)

Patna Pirates	40 - 40	Gujarat Giants
TBA	Result	TBA

Match tied

Match 126
21 December 2024
21:00 (IST)

Dabang Delhi K.C.	33 - 31	Jaipur Pink Panthers
TBA	Result	TBA

Dabang Delhi K.C. won

Match 127
22 December 2024
20:00 (IST)

Tamil Thalaivas	42 - 32	Bengaluru Bulls
TBA	Result	TBA

Tamil Thalaivas won

Match 128
22 December 2024
21:00 (IST)

Haryana Steelers	47 - 30	U Mumba
TBA	Result	TBA

Haryana Steelers won

Match 129
23 December 2024
20:00 (IST)

Gujarat Giants	31 - 45	Dabang Delhi K.C.
TBA	Result	TBA

Dabang Delhi K.C. won

Match 130
23 December 2024
21:00 (IST)

Puneri Paltan	42 - 32	Tamil Thalaivas
TBA	Result	TBA

Puneri Paltan won

Match 131
24 December 2024
20:00 (IST)

Bengaluru Bulls	30 - 44	UP Yoddhas
TBA	Result	TBA

UP Yoddhas won

Match 132
24 December 2024
21:00 (IST)

Bengal Warriorz	27 - 36	U Mumba
TBA	Result	TBA

U Mumba won

== Playoffs ==
Eliminators
Eliminator 1
UP Yoddhas	46
Jaipur Pink Panthers	18
Eliminator 2
Patna Pirates	31
U Mumba	23

Semi-finals
Semi-final 1
Haryana Steelers	28
UP Yoddhas	25
Semi-final 2
Dabang Delhi K.C.	28
Patna Pirates	32

Final
Haryana Steelers	32
Patna Pirates	23

=== Eliminator 1 ===
Match 133
26 December 2024
20:00 (IST)

UP Yoddhas	46 – 18	Jaipur Pink Panthers
	Report

UP Yoddhas won

=== Eliminator 2 ===
Match 134
26 December 2024
21:00 (IST)

Patna Pirates	31 – 23	U Mumba
	Report

Patna Pirates won

=== Semi Final 1 ===
Match 135
27 December 2024
20:00 (IST)

Haryana Steelers	28 – 25	UP Yoddhas
Shivam Patare (7)	Report	Gagan Gowda (10)

Haryana Steelers won

=== Semi Final 2 ===
Match 136
27 December 2024
21:00 (IST)

Dabang Delhi K.C.	28 – 32	Patna Pirates
Ashu Malik (9)	Report	Ayan (8)

Patna Pirates won

=== Final ===
Match 137
29 December 2024
20:00 (IST)

Haryana Steelers	32 – 23	Patna Pirates
Shivam Patare (9)	Report	Gurdeep (6)

Haryana Steelers won

== Statistics ==
=== Most raid points ===
#	Player	Team	Raid Points
1	(India) Devank	Patna Pirates	288
2	(India) Ashu Malik	Dabang Delhi	239
2	(India) Arjun Deshwal	Jaipur Pink Panthers	225
4	(India) Ajit Ramesh Chouhan	U Mumba	173
5	(India) Vijay Malik	Telugu Titans	172
As of 29 December 2024

=== Most tackle points ===
#	Player	Team	Tackle Points
1	(Iran) Mohammadreza Shadloui	Haryana Steelers	82
2	(India) Ankit Janglan	Patna Pirates	79
3	(India) Nitesh Kumar	Tamil Thalaivas	77
4	(India) Yogesh Dahiya	Dabang Delhi	75
5	(India) Nitin Rawal	Bengaluru Bulls	74
5	(India) Hitesh	UP Yoddhas	74
As of 29 December 2024
