= V Ajith Kumar =

Indian Kabaddi player

Personal information
- Nationality: Indian
- Born: 15 July 1998 (age 27)

Sport
- Country: India
- Sport: Kabaddi
- Position: Left raider
- League: Pro Kabaddi League
- Team: Tamil Thalaivas - 2019; U Mumba - 2021; Jaipur Pink Panthers - 2022-23

V Ajith Kumar is an Indian kabaddi player from Tamil Nadu, who plays for the Jaipur Pink Panthers in the Pro Kabaddi League as a raider. He was picked up by Tamil Thalaivas in Pro Kabaddi League S7 for his debut season. In Pro Kabaddi League S8 he was picked up by U Mumba. In Pro Kabaddi League S9, he was picked up by the Jaipur Pink Panthers and won the 2022 Pro Kabaddi League.

== Early life ==
Kumar was born in Tamil Nadu, India. He completed his graduation there. He was dedicated to playing kabaddi from an early age, playing many national games like the 67th Senior National Games and 68th Senior National Games. Later he was picked up by Tamil Thalaivas in PKL Season-9 as a new young player.

== Career ==
Kumar started playing kabaddi at an early age and 2019 Pro Kabaddi League was his debut season. Later, he was bought by U Mumba, and then in 2022 Pro Kabaddi League he was bought by Jaipur Pink Panthers.
