= Sunil Kumar (kabaddi) =

Indian kabaddi player

Personal information
- Nationality: Indian
- Born: 12 May 1997 (age 29) Sonipat District, Haryana

Sport
- Country: India
- Sport: Kabaddi
- League: Pro Kabaddi League
- Team: Patna Pirates (2016); Gujarat Giants (2017-2021); Jaipur Pink Panthers (2022-2023); U Mumba (2024-present)
Medal record
Men's kabaddi
Representing India
Asian Games
Gold medal – first place	2026 Aichi–Nagoya	Team
Gold medal – first place	2022 Hangzhou	Team
Asian Championship
Gold medal – first place	2023 Busan	Team
South Asian Games
Gold medal – first place	2019 Kathmandu	Team

Sunil Kumar (born 12 May 1997), also known as Sunil Malik, is an Indian kabaddi player from Haryana. He plays in the Pro Kabaddi League (PKL) for the U Mumba franchise as a defender.

== Early life and background ==
Kumar is from a farmer's family in Bhainswal Kalan, Sonipat District, Haryana. Many of his cousins including, Parvesh Bhainswal, used to play kabaddi. Inspired by them, he took to the game at the age of 11 years. He did well at the university games and was spotted by coach Jaivir Sharma and later joined the Sports Authority of India training centre at Ahmedabad.

== Career ==
After winning the Junior Nationals in 2015 and 2016, Kumar was picked up by Patna Pirates for the PKL season 4. He later transferred to Jaipur Pink Panthers. he later won his second trophy with Jaipur pink panthers in 2022 as a captain .In 2023, Kumar competed for India at the 2022 Asian Games, where the Indian team won gold, controversially defeating Iran 33–29 in the finals.
