= Darshan Kadian =

Indian Kabaddi player (born 1994)

Personal information
- Nationality: Indian
- Born: 1994 (age 31–32) Majra D village, Jhajjar district, Haryana, India
- Occupation: Indian Army
- Height: 5 ft 9 in (175 cm)

Sport
- Country: India
- Position: Right Raider
- League: Pro Kabaddi League
- Club: U Mumba; Puneri Paltan; Patna Pirates
- Team: India national kabaddi team
Medal record
Representing India
Pro Kabaddi
Winner	2016 PRO Kabaddi
South Asian Games
Gold medal – first place	2019 Kathmandu	Team

Darshan Kadian (born 1994) is an Indian Kabaddi player. He was part of the Indian team which won gold medal at the 2019 South Asian Games. He has also featured in all the seasons of the Pro Kabaddi League. He is a member of the Puneri Paltan team.
