= Sukesh Hegde =

Indian Kabaddi player

Personal information
- Nationality: Indian
- Born: 2 October 1989 (age 36) Kadthala village, Karkala taluk, Karnataka, India
- Occupation: Kabaddi Player
- Years active: 2014 - present
- Height: 180 cm (5 ft 11 in)
- Spouse: Krithika Hegde

Sport
- Country: India
- Sport: Kabaddi
- Position: Raider
- League: Pro Kabaddi League
- Club: Telugu Titans (2014-2017); Gujarat Fortune Giants (2017-18); Tamil Thalaivas (2018-2019); Bengal Warriors (2019-2021); Patna Pirates (2022-present)
- Coached by: BC Ramesh

Sukesh Hegde is an Indian professional kabaddi player who currently plays as a raider for Bengal Warriors in the Pro Kabaddi League.

== Early life ==
Sukesh Hegde was born and brought up in Karkala. He has completed his graduation from Alva's College, Moodbidri.

== Career ==
In 2014, he started his Pro Kabaddi League journey as a raider of Telugu Titans. In 2017, Sukesh was picked by Gujarat Fortune Giants as their captain for their maiden campaign. In 2018, he was signed by Tamil Thalaivas and in 2019, he was purchased by Bengal Warriors.

== Career statistics ==
As of 20 September 2019.

Club Team	Season	Total Apps	Raid Points	Tackle Points	Total Points
Telugu Titans	2014	14	79	4	83
Telugu Titans	2015	13	62	2	64
Telugu Titans	2016	13	61	3	64
Telugu Titans	2016 Pro Kabaddi League season (June)	9	7	0	7
Gujarat Fortune Giants	2017	18	75	2	77
Tamil Thalaivas	2018	17	68	3	71
Bengal Warriors	2019	16	63	2	65
Total		100	413	16	429
