= Rohit Kumar (kabaddi) =

Indian illustrator

Personal information
- Nickname: Rohit Akki
- Nationality: Indian
- Height: 6 ft 0 in (183 cm)

Sport
- Country: India
- Sport: Pro Kabaddi
- Position: Raider
- League: Pro Kabaddi League
- Club: 2016 – Patna Pirates; 2017–2020 – Bengaluru Bulls; 2021 – Telugu Titans; 2022 – Gujarat Giants
- Team: India
Medal record
Representing India
South Asian Games
Gold medal – first place	2016 Guwahati	Team
Gold medal – first place	2019 Katmandu	Team
Asian Games
Bronze medal – third place	2018 Jakarta	Team

Rohit Kumar is an Indian professional Kabaddi player who plays for Gujarat Giants in the Pro Kabaddi League. He was the captain of Bengaluru Bulls which won the Pro Kabaddi League in Season 6. He is regarded as one of the best players of the game. He was a part of the Indian contingent in the Asian Kabaddi championship 2017, 2018 squad for Kabaddi Masters Dubai and also in Asian games 2018

== PKL auction prices ==
Season	Club	Year	Sold price	Ref
III	Patna Pirates	2016	Unknown	
IV	Bengaluru Bulls	2016	Unknown	
V	Bengaluru Bulls	2017	₹81.00 Lakh	
VI	Bengaluru Bulls	2018	₹89.10 Lakh	
VII	Bengaluru Bulls	2019	Unknown	
VIII	Telugu Titans	2021	₹36.00 Lakh	
IX	Gujarat Giants	2022	Unknown	
Total			Min. 2.061 Crore	

== Career statistics ==
League	Team	Season	Year	Matches	Raid points	Super 10s	Tackle points	Total points
Pro Kabaddi League	Patna Pirates	III	2016 (January)	12	102	5	7	109
Pro Kabaddi League	Bengaluru Bulls	IV	2016 (June)	14	93	1	7	100
Pro Kabaddi League	Bengaluru Bulls	V	2017	22	219	12	12	231
Pro Kabaddi League	Bengaluru Bulls	VI	2018	24	162	5	9	171
Pro Kabaddi League	Bengaluru Bulls	VII	2019	19	94	3	6	100
Pro Kabaddi League	Telugu Titans	VIII	2021	8	12	0	6	18
Pro Kabaddi League	Gujarat Giants	IX	2022	2	1	0	0	1
Total				101	683	26	47	730

== Indian Kabaddi Team ==
Kumar was selected in the national squad for the 2016 South Asian Games held in Guwahati and Shillong.

== Honours ==
Patna Pirates

- Pro Kabaddi League: 2016 (January)

Bengaluru Bulls

- Pro Kabaddi League: 2018
