= Nitesh Kumar =

Indian kabaddi player

Personal information
- Nationality: Indian
- Born: 12 August 1997 (age 29)
- Occupation: Kabaddi player
- Weight: 74 kg (163 lb)

Sport
- Sport: Kabaddi
- League: VIVO Pro Kabaddi League
- Team: UP Yoddhas (2017-2023); Bengal Warriorz (2024-present)
Medal record
Men's kabaddi
Representing India
Asian Games
Gold medal – first place	2022 Hangzhou	Team
South Asian Games
Gold medal – first place	2019 Kathmandu	Team

Nitesh Kumar (born 12 August 1997) is an Indian kabaddi player who currently plays for Bengal Warriorz in Pro Kabaddi League. Kumar was picked up by Yoddha in the season 5 auction. In season 6, he became the first player in the league history to score 100 tackle points in a single campaign. He is part of the Indian team that won gold medal at the 2022 Asian Games. India beat Iran 33–29 in a controversial final.

== Early life ==
Nitesh pursued a career in kabaddi, which was encouraged by his father, who was also a kabaddi player.

== Career ==
=== Pro-Kabaddi league ===
Season 5

Nitesh made his debut for UP Yoddha’s against the Telugu Titans in Hyderabad in season 5 and scored five tackle points in his team's 31–18 victory. He played 19 games in the season and scored 47 tackle points with four High 5s.

Season 6

Nitish scored 20 tackle points in Yoddha's first seven matches with the team managing three wins through that spell. The next nine games yielded no wins for the Yoddha, but Nitesh scored 40 tackle points over that period. In the final six games of the campaign, Yoddha won five and tied one and Nitesh scored 25 tackle points as Yoddha qualified for the playoffs. In the first eliminator against U Mumba, Nitesh scored eight tackle points as the Yoddha beat U Mumba 34–29. He scored three more tackle points in his team's 45–33 victory over Dabang Delhi in the next eliminator match. In the second qualifier against the Gujarat Giants, Nitesh scored six tackle points to reach 100 tackle points for the season.

== Records and achievements ==
- Best Defender, 2018 Pro Kabaddi League
