= Sons of the Soil: Jaipur Pink Panthers =

Indian sports documentary web series

- Directed by: Alex Gale & Omkar Potdar
- Starring: Abhishek Bachchan; Bunty Walia; Sandeep Dhull; Amit Hooda; Deepak Hooda; Saurabh Mishra; Deepak Narwal; Nitin Rawal; Srinivas Reddy; Nilesh Salunke
- Country of origin: India
- Original language: Hindi
- No. of seasons: 1
- No. of episodes: 5

Production
- Producer: BBC Studios India
- Running time: 150 min

Original release
- Network: Amazon Prime Video

Sons of the Soil: Jaipur Pink Panthers is an Indian sports documentary television series. It features Abhishek Bachchan, Bunty Walia, Sandeep Dhull, Amit Hooda, Deepak Hooda, Saurabh Mishra, Deepak Narwal, Nitin Rawal, Srinivas Reddy, and Nilesh Salunke. It is directed by Alex Gale & Omkar Potdar and is produced by BBC Studios India. The docu-series follows the journey of Bollywood star Abhishek Bachchan owned kabaddi team, the Jaipur Pink Panthers in the seventh season of the Pro Kabaddi League. The series premiered through the streaming platform Amazon Prime Video on December 4, 2020.

== Synopsis ==
The 5 part docu-series follows the players personal and professional journey throughout the season.

== Cast ==
- Abhishek Bachchan
- Bunty Walia
- Sandeep Dhull
- Amit Hooda
- Deepak Hooda
- Saurabh Mishra
- Deepak Narwal
- Nitin Rawal
- Srinivas Reddy
- Nilesh Salunke

== Release ==
The series premiered through the streaming platform Amazon Prime Video on December 4, 2020.

== Reception ==
Saibal Chatterjee from NDTV gave the series 3 out of 5 stars and appreciated the quality of the series and compared the series with the high intensity of the game itself, she further explained her views on the series. " Shubham Kulkarni from Koimoi wrote that the series gives its viewers a unique perspective of the sport and that, it's a treat for the pro kabaddi fanbase.

Pramit Chatterjee from Mashable rated the doc-series 3 out of 5 and stated that the representation of players personal and professional life was extremely well documented.
