= Parteek Dahiya =

Indian kabaddi player

Personal information
- Full name: Parteek Dahiya
- Born: 11 June 2002 (age 24) Sonipat, Haryana, India
- Occupation: Kabaddi player
- Height: 5 fit 10 in
- Weight: 69 kg (152 lb)

Sport
- Country: India
- Sport: Kabaddi
- League: Pro Kabaddi League
- Team: Gujarat Giants
- Coached by: Ram Meher Singh

Parteek Dahiya (born 11 June 2002) is an Indian kabaddi player who plays for Gujarat Giants in Pro Kabaddi League. Dahiya was picked up by Gujarat Giants in the Season 9 auction. In Pro Kabaddi League, Dahiya scored 183 points and got 6th place in top 10 ten raiders of pkl season 9.

== Early life ==
Parteek Dahiya was born in Sonipat district of Haryana. His father is a farmer and mother a homemaker. Prateek started playing Kabaddi inspired by his maternal uncle Deepak Niwas Hooda. His sister Preeti Dahiya is an international level boxer. His maternal uncle Deepak Niwas Hooda is an international Kabaddi player and has also captained the Indian Kabaddi team. His maternal aunt Sweety Boora is also an international boxer.

== Kabaddi career ==
Parteek Dahiya was bought by Patana pairets in PKL season 8 auction but he did not get a chance to play any match. He Scored 250 points leading his maternal uncle's team Deepak Niwas Hooda Foundation in the 2022 k7 kabaddi league. In pkl season 9 playing for Gujarat giants he scored total 183 points in 19 matches with 178 raid points and 5 tackles.
