= 2018–19 Pro Kabaddi League =

6th Season of Pro Kabaddi League

Vivo Pro Kabaddi – 2018 Season 6
Tournament information
- Dates: 7 October 2018–5 January 2019
- Administrator: Mashal Sports
- Tournament format(s): Double round robin and playoffs
- Host(s): India
- Teams: 12
- Website: prokabaddi.com

Final positions
- Champion: Bengaluru Bulls (1st title)
- Runner-up: Gujarat Fortunegiants

Tournament statistics
- Matches played: 138
- Top scorer(s): (India) Pawan Sehrawat (271) (Bengaluru Bulls)
- Most tackle points: (India) Nitesh Kumar (100) (UP Yoddha)
- Most successful raids: (India) Pawan Sehrawat (209) (Bengaluru Bulls)
- Most successful tackles: (India) Nitesh Kumar (92) (UP Yoddha)

The 2018–19 Vivo Pro Kabaddi League was the sixth season of Pro Kabaddi League, a professional kabaddi league in India since 2014. The season began on 7 October 2018 and concluded on 5 January 2019.

Bengaluru Bulls defeated Gujarat Fortune Giants in the final match to win their maiden title.

== Stadiums and locations of teams ==
Zone A Zone B
Locations of the Pro Kabaddi teams

=== Personnel and sponsorship ===
Teams	Owners	Captain	Head coach	Kit Manufacturer	Kit Sponsor
Bengal Warriors	Kishore Biyani	(India) PO Surjeet Singh	(India) Jagdish Kumble	Spunk	Future Pay
Bengaluru Bulls	Badri Narayan Choudhary Kota, Ananda Giri	(India) Rohit Kumar	(India) Randhir Singh Sherhawat	Shiv-Naresh	AbhiPaisa
Dabang Delhi KC	Radha Kapoor	(India) Joginder Narwal	(India) Krishan Kumar Hooda		Awfis
Gujarat Giants	Gautam Adani	(India) Sunil Kumar	(India) Manpreet Singh	Shiv-Naresh	Fru2go
Haryana Steelers	Sajjan Jindal	(India) Surender Nada	(India) Rambir Singh Khokhar	Alcis	Herbalife Nutrition
Jaipur Pink Panthers	Abhishek Bachchan	(India) Deepak Niwas Hooda	(India) Srinivas Reddy	D:FY	Finolex Cables
Patna Pirates	Rajesh V. Shah	(India) Pardeep Narwal	(India) Ram Mehar Singh	4U Sports	Birla Gold Cement
Puneri Paltan	Rajesh Harkishandas Doshi, Sumanlal Babulal Shah, Nallepilly Ramaswami Subramanian	(India) Girish Maruti Ernak	(India) Ashan Kumar	Equio	Force Motors
Tamil Thalaivas	Nimmagadda Prasad, Sachin Tendulkar, Allu arjun, Ram Charan &, Allu Aravind	(India) Ajay Thakur	(India) E Baskaran		Orbit Wires & Cables
Telugu Titans	Srinivas Sreeramaneni	(India) Vishal Bharadwaj	(India) Kilaru Jagmohan	Vats	Greenko
U Mumba	Ronnie Screwvala	(Iran) Fazel Atrachali	(Iran) Gholamreza Mazandarai		Indigo Paints
UP Yoddha	Grandhi Mallikarjuna Rao	(India) Rishank Devadiga	(India) Jasveer Singh	T10 Sports	Tata Yodha

=== Foreign players ===
Each team can sign maximum 3 foreign players in the squad.

Teams	Player 1	Player 2	Player 3
Bengal Warriors	(South Korea) Jang Kun Lee	(Bangladesh) Ziaur Rahman	–
Bengaluru Bulls	(South Korea) Dong Ju Hong	(South Korea) Gyung Tae Kim	–
Dabang Delhi KC	(Thailand) Khomsan Thongkham	(Iran) Meraj Sheykh	–
Gujarat Fortune Giants	(South Korea) Dong Geon Lee	(Iran) Hadi Oshtorak	–
Haryana Steelers	(Bangladesh) Md. Zakir Hossain	(Kenya) Patrick Nzau Muvai	–
Jaipur Pink Panthers	(Kenya) David Shilisia J Mosambayi	(South Korea) Young Chang Ko	–
Patna Pirates	(South Korea) Hyunil Park	(South Korea) Tae Deok Eom	–
Puneri Paltan	(Nepal) Lal Mohar Yadav	(Nepal) Sanjay Shrestha	–
Tamil Thalaivas	(South Korea) Chan Sik Park	(Kenya) Victor Onyango Obiero	–
Telugu Titans	(Iran) Mohsen Maghsoudloujafari	(Iran) Farhad Rahimi Milaghardan	(Iran) Abozar Mohajermighani
U Mumba	(Iran) Fazel Atrachali	(Iran) Abolfazl Maghsodloumahali	(Iran) Hadi Tajik
UP Yoddha	(Bangladesh) Sulieman Kabir	(South Korea) Seong Ryeol Kim	–

== Sponsorship ==
Title Sponsor

- Vivo

Powered by

- Thums Up Charged

Associate Sponsors

- Bajaj Electricals
- Tata Motors
- Honda
- Gillette Mach3
- Dream11

Partners

- RR Kabel
- UltraTech Cement
- Britannia
- McDowell's No.1
- HDFC Life

Broadcast Sponsor

- Star Sports

== Points table ==
The teams are divided into two zones with each zone having six teams based on their geographical proximity. Each team will play 15 intra-zonal matches and 7 inter-zonal matches.
Zone A

Team	Pld	W	L	D	SD	Pts
Gujarat Fortune Giants (R)	22	17	3	2	117	93
U Mumba	22	15	5	2	189	86
Dabang Delhi KC	22	11	9	2	-1	68
Puneri Paltan	22	8	12	2	-45	52
Jaipur Pink Panthers	22	6	13	3	-69	43
Haryana Steelers	22	6	14	2	-91	42

Zone B

Team	Pld	W	L	D	SD	Pts
Bengaluru Bulls (C)	22	13	7	2	104	78
Bengal Warriors	22	12	8	2	2	69
UP Yoddha	22	8	10	4	-45	57
Patna Pirates	22	9	11	2	-36	55
Telugu Titans	22	8	13	1	-55	51
Tamil Thalaivas	22	5	13	4	-70	42

Source: ProKabaddi

- advanced to Qualifier 1
- advanced to Eliminators
- Five (5) points for a win
- Three (3) points each for a drawn game
- One (1) point for a loss by 7 points or fewer
- Top three teams from each zone qualify for the playoffs

== Tournament statistics ==
=== Best raiders ===
As of 5 January 2019

Rank	Player	Team	Matches	Total Points
1	(India) Pawan Sehrawat	Bengaluru Bulls	24	271
2	(India) Pardeep Narwal	Patna Pirates	21	233
3	(India) Siddharth Sirish Desai	U Mumba	21	218
4	(India) Maninder Singh	Bengal Warriors	22	206
5	(India) Ajay Thakur	Tamil Thalaivas	22	203

=== Best defenders ===
Rank	Player	Team	Matches	Tackle Points
1	(India) Nitesh Kumar	UP Yoddha	25	100
2	(India) Parvesh Bhainswal	Gujarat Giants	25	86
3	(Iran) Fazel Atrachali	U Mumba	23	83
4	(India) Sunil Kumar	Gujarat Giants	25	76
5	(India) Sandeep Dhull	Jaipur Pink Panthers	22	67

== League stage ==
Source:prokabaddi.com

=== Leg 1 – Jawaharlal Nehru Indoor Stadium, Chennai ===
Match 1
7 October 2018
20:00

Tamil Thalaivas	42–26	Patna Pirates
	Report

Tamil Thalaivas won

Match 2
7 October 2018
21:00

Puneri Paltan	32–32	U Mumba
	Report

Match Tied

Match 3
8 October 2018
20:00

Puneri Paltan	34–22	Haryana Steelers
	Report

Puneri Paltan won

Match 4
8 October 2018
21:00

Tamil Thalaivas	32–37	UP Yoddha
	Report

UP Yoddha won

Match 5
9 October 2018
20:00

Dabang Delhi	32–32	Gujarat Fortune Giants
	Report

Match tied

Match 6
9 October 2018
21:00

Tamil Thalaivas	28–33	Telugu Titans
	Report

Telugu Titans won

Match 7
10 October 2018
20:00

U Mumba	39–32	Jaipur Pink Panthers
	Report

U Mumba won

Match 8
10 October 2018
21:00

Tamil Thalaivas	37–48	Bengaluru Bulls
	Report

Bengaluru Bulls won

Match 9
11 October 2018
20:00

UP Yoddha	41–43	Patna Pirates
	Report

Patna Pirates won

Match 10
11 October 2018
21:00

Tamil Thalaivas	27–36	Bengal Warriors
	Report

Bengal Warriors won

=== Leg 2 – Motilal Nehru School of Sports, Sonepat ===
Match 11
12 October 2018
20:00

Haryana Steelers	36–25	Gujarat Fortune Giants
	Report

Haryana Steelers won

Match 12
12 October 2018
21:00

Puneri Paltan	37–41	Dabang Delhi
	Report

Dabang Delhi won

Match 13
13 October 2018
20:00

Telugu Titans	34–29	UP Yoddha
	Report

Telugu Titans won

Match 14
13 October 2018
21:00

Haryana Steelers	26–53	U Mumba
	Report

U Mumba won

Match 15
14 October 2018
20:00

Patna Pirates	43–37	UP Yoddha
	Report

Patna Pirates won

Match 16
14 October 2018
21:00

Haryana Steelers	27–45	Puneri Paltan
	Report

Puneri Paltan won

Match 17
16 October 2018
20:00

Bengal Warriors	30–25	Telugu Titans
	Report

Bengal Warriors won

Match 18
16 October 2018
21:00

Haryana Steelers	33–36	Jaipur Pink Panthers
	Report

Jaipur Pink Panthers won

Match 19
17 October 2018
20:00

Bengaluru Bulls	44–35	Tamil Thalaivas
	Report

Bengaluru Bulls won

Match 20
17 October 2018
21:00

Haryana Steelers	32–42	U Mumba
	Report

U Mumba won

Match 21
18 October 2018
20:00

Haryana Steelers	34–31	Dabang Delhi
	Report

Haryana Steelers won

=== Leg 3 – Shree Shiv Chhatrapati Sports Complex, Pune ===
Match 22
18 October 2018
21:00

Puneri Paltan	28–34	Gujarat Fortune Giants
	Report

Gujarat Fortune Giants won

Match 23
19 October 2018
20:00

Patna Pirates	31–35	Telugu Titans
	Report

Telugu Titans won

Match 24
19 October 2018
21:00

Puneri Paltan	29–25	Jaipur Pink Panthers
	Report

Puneri Paltan won

Match 25
20 October 2018
20:00

UP Yoddha	40–40	Bengal Warriors
	Report

Match tied

Match 26
20 October 2018
21:00

Puneri Paltan	33–32	U Mumba
	Report

Puneri Paltan won

Match 27
Inter Zone Challenge Week
21 October 2018
20:00

Dabang Delhi	39–30	Bengal Warriors
	Report

Dabang Delhi won

Match 28
Inter Zone Challenge Week
21 October 2018
21:00

Puneri Paltan	27–25	Bengaluru Bulls
	Report

Bengaluru Bulls won

Match 29
Inter Zone Challenge Week
23 October 2018
20:00

U Mumba	41–20	Telugu Titans
	Report

U Mumba won

Match 30
Inter Zone Challenge Week
23 October 2018
21:00

Puneri Paltan	31–36	Tamil Thalaivas
	Report

Tamil Thalaivas won

Match 31
Inter Zone Challenge Week
24 October 2018
20:00

Bengaluru Bulls	42–34	Haryana Steelers
	Report

Bengaluru Bulls won

Match 32
Inter Zone Challenge Week
24 October 2018
21:00

Puneri Paltan	23–29	UP Yoddha
	Report

UP Yoddha won

=== Leg 4 – Patliputra Sports Complex, Patna ===
Match 33
Inter Zone Challenge Week
26 October 2018
20:00

Patna Pirates	41–30	Jaipur Pink Panthers
	Report

Patna Pirates won

Match 34
Inter Zone Challenge Week
26 October 2018
21:00

Gujarat Fortune Giants	36–25	Tamil Thalaivas
	Report

Gujarat Fortune Giants won

Match 35
Inter Zone Challenge Week
27 October 2018
20:00

Jaipur Pink Panthers	28–39	Bengal Warriors
	Report

Bengal Warriors won

Match 36
Inter Zone Challenge Week
27 October 2018
21:00

Patna Pirates	39–40	U Mumba
	Report

U Mumba won

Match 37
Inter Zone Challenge Week
28 October 2018
20:00

Dabang Delhi	36–38	UP Yoddha
	Report

UP Yoddha won

Match 38
Inter Zone Challenge Week
28 October 2018
21:00

Patna Pirates	32–43	Haryana Steelers
	Report

Haryana Steelers won

Match 39
30 October 2018
20:00

Puneri Paltan	27–37	Gujarat Fortune Giants
	Report

Gujarat Fortune Giants won

Match 40
30 October 2018
21:00

Patna Pirates	32–53	Telugu Titans
	Report

Telugu Titans won

Match 41
31 October 2018
20:00

Dabang Delhi	27–31	Puneri Paltan
	Report

Puneri Paltan won

Match 42
31 October 2018
21:00

Patna Pirates	41–43	Bengaluru Bulls
	Report

Bengaluru Bulls won

Match 43
1 November 2018
20:00

Patna Pirates	29–27	Bengal Warriors
	Report

Patna Pirates won

=== Leg 5 – Shaheed Vijay Singh Pathik Sports Complex, Greater Noida ===
Match 44
2 November 2018
20:00

UP Yoddha	24–46	Tamil Thalaivas
	Report

Tamil Thalaivas won

Match 45
2 November 2018
21:00

Jaipur Pink Panthers	25–36	Gujarat Fortune Giants
	Report

Gujarat Fortune Giants won

Match 46
3 November 2018
20:00

U Mumba	31–22	Puneri Paltan
	Report

U Mumba won

Match 47
3 November 2018
21:00

UP Yoddha	29–35	Bengaluru Bulls
	Report

Bengaluru Bulls won

Match 48
4 November 2018
20:00

Dabang Delhi	38–45	Gujarat Fortune Giants
	Report

Gujarat Fortune Giants won

Match 49
4 November 2018
21:00

UP Yoddha	30–30	Bengal Warriors
	Report

Match Tied

Match 50
6 November 2018
20:00

Jaipur Pink Panthers	38–32	Haryana Steelers
	Report

Jaipur Pink Panthers won

Match 51
6 November 2018
21:00

UP Yoddha	26–26	Telugu Titans
	Report

Match Tied

Match 52
8 November 2018
20:00

Haryana Steelers	33–39	Dabang Delhi
	Report

Dabang Delhi won

Match 53
8 November 2018
21:00

UP Yoddha	27–37	Bengaluru Bulls
	Report

Bengaluru Bulls won

=== Leg 6 – Dome@NSCI SVP Stadium, Mumbai ===
Match 54
9 November 2018
20:00

U Mumba	48–24	Jaipur Pink Panthers
	Report

U Mumba won

Match 55
9 November 2018
21:00

Bengal Warriors	30–25	Telugu Titans
	Report

Bengal Warriors won

Match 56
10 November 2018
20:00

Patna Pirates	50–30	Bengal Warriors
	Report

Patna Pirates won

Match 57
10 November 2018
21:00

U Mumba	36–38	Gujarat Fortune Giants
	Report

Gujarat Fortune Giants won

Match 58
11 November 2018
20:00

Jaipur Pink Panthers	29–40	Dabang Delhi
	Report

Dabang Delhi won

Match 59
11 November 2018
21:00

U Mumba	31–35	Haryana Steelers
	Report

Haryana Steelers won

Match 60
Inter Zone Challenge Week
13 November 2018
20:00

Puneri Paltan	25–28	Telugu Titans
	Report

Telugu Titans won

Match 61
Inter Zone Challenge Week
13 November 2018
21:00

U Mumba	41–24	UP Yoddha
	Report

U Mumba won

Match 62
Inter Zone Challenge Week
14 November 2018
20:00

Tamil Thalaivas	32–32	Haryana Steelers
	Report

Match tied

Match 63
Inter Zone Challenge Week
14 November 2018
21:00

U Mumba	32–29	Bengaluru Bulls
	Report

U Mumba won

Match 64
Inter Zone Challenge Week
15 November 2018
20:00

Patna Pirates	38–35	Dabang Delhi
	Report

Patna Pirates won

Match 65
Inter Zone Challenge Week
15 November 2018
21:00

U Mumba	36–22	Tamil Thalaivas
	Report

U Mumba won

=== Leg 7 – The Arena, Ahmedabad ===
Match 66
Inter Zone Challenge Week
16 November 2018
20:00

Gujarat Fortune Giants	35–23	Bengal Warriors
	Report

Gujarat Fortune Giants won

Match 67
Inter Zone Challenge Week
16 November 2018
21:00

Jaipur Pink Panthers	45–28	UP Yoddha
	Report

Jaipur Pink Panthers won

Match 68
Inter Zone Challenge Week
17 November 2018
20:00

Puneri Paltan	22–26	Bengal Warriors
	Report

Bengal Warriors won

Match 69
Inter Zone Challenge Week
17 November 2018
21:00

Gujarat Fortune Giants	30–30	Bengaluru Bulls
	Report

Match Tied

Match 70
Inter Zone Challenge Week
18 November 2018
20:00

Jaipur Pink Panthers	32–45	Bengaluru Bulls
	Report

Bengaluru Bulls won

Match 71
Inter Zone Challenge Week
18 November 2018
21:00

Gujarat Fortune Giants	37–32	UP Yoddha
	Report

Gujarat Fortune Giants won

Match 72
20 November 2018
20:00

Tamil Thalaivas	27–23	Telugu Titans
	Report

Tamil Thalaivas won

Match 73
20 November 2018
21:00

Gujarat Fortune Giants	26–29	Dabang Delhi
	Report

Dabang Delhi won

Match 74
21 November 2018
20:00

Patna Pirates	45–27	Tamil Thalaivas
	Report

Patna Pirates won

Match 75
21 November 2018
21:00

Gujarat Fortune Giants	39–35	U Mumba
	Report

Gujarat Fortune Giants won

Match 76
22 November 2018
20:00

Gujarat Fortune Giants	40–31	Haryana Steelers
	Report

Gujarat Fortune Giants won

=== Leg 8 – Shree Shiv Chhatrapati Sports Complex, Pune ===
Match 77
23 November 2018
20:00

Bengaluru Bulls	31–33	Bengal Warriors
	Report

Bengal Warriors won

Match 78
23 November 2018
21:00

Jaipur Pink Panthers	30–30	Puneri Paltan
	Report

Match Tied

Match 79
24 November 2018
20:00

U Mumba	39–23	Dabang Delhi
	Report

U Mumba won

Match 80
24 November 2018
21:00

Bengaluru Bulls	36–22	Tamil Thalaivas
	Report

Bengaluru Bulls won

Match 81
25 November 2018
20:00

Dabang Delhi	27–34	Haryana Steelers
	Report

Haryana Steelers won

Match 82
25 November 2018
21:00

Bengaluru Bulls	32–35	Patna Pirates
	Report

Patna Pirates won

Match 83
26 November 2018
20:00

Tamil Thalaivas	31–25	Telugu Titans
	Report

Tamil Thalaivas won

Match 84
26 November 2018
21:00

Bengaluru Bulls	37–27	UP Yoddha
	Report

Bengaluru Bulls won

Match 85
28 November 2018
20:00

Haryana Steelers	33–35	Puneri Paltan
	Report

Puneri Paltan won

Match 86
28 November 2018
21:00

Bengaluru Bulls	34–26	Telugu Titans
	Report

Bengaluru Bulls won

Match 87
29 November 2018
20:00

Puneri Paltan	20–35	Gujarat Fortune Giants
	Report

Gujarat Fortune Giants won

Match 88
29 November 2018
21:00

Bengaluru Bulls	37–44	Bengal Warriors
	Report

Bengal Warriors won

=== Leg 9 – Thyagaraj Sports Complex, New Delhi ===
Match 89
30 November 2018
20:00

Dabang Delhi	48–35	Jaipur Pink Panthers
	Report

Dabang Delhi won

Match 90
30 November 2018
21:00

Tamil Thalaivas	35–35	Patna Pirates
	Report

Match Tied

Match 91
1 December 2018
20:00

Dabang Delhi	34–41	U Mumba
	Report

U Mumba won

Match 92
2 December 2018
20:00

U Mumba	36–26	Gujarat Fortune Giants
	Report

U Mumba won

Match 93
2 December 2018
21:00

Dabang Delhi	35–24	Puneri Paltan
	Report

Dabang Delhi won

Match 94
Inter Zone Challenge Week
4 December 2018
20:00

Patna Pirates	27–45	Gujarat Fortune Giants
	Report

Gujarat Fortune Giants won

Match 95
Inter Zone Challenge Week
4 December 2018
21:00

Dabang Delhi	34–29	Telugu Titans
	Report

Dabang Delhi won

Match 96
Inter Zone Challenge Week
5 December 2018
20:00

Haryana Steelers	35–33	Bengal Warriors
	Report

Haryana Steelers won

Match 97
Inter Zone Challenge Week
5 December 2018
21:00

Dabang Delhi	32–31	Bengaluru Bulls
	Report

Dabang Delhi won

Match 98
Inter Zone Challenge Week
6 December 2018
20:00

UP Yoddha	30–29	Haryana Steelers
	Report

UP Yoddha won

Match 99
Inter Zone Challenge Week
6 December 2018
21:00

Dabang Delhi	37–33	Tamil Thalaivas
	Report

Dabang Delhi won

=== Leg 10 – Rajiv Gandhi Indoor Stadium, Vizag ===
Match 100
Inter Zone Challenge Week
7 December 2018
20:00

Telugu Titans	27–29	Gujarat Fortune Giants
	Report

Gujarat Fortune Giants won

Match 101
Inter Zone Challenge Week
7 December 2018
21:00

Patna Pirates	53–36	Puneri Paltan
	Report

Patna Pirates won

Match 102
Inter Zone Challenge Week
8 December 2018
20:00

U Mumba	31–20	Bengal Warriors
	Report

U Mumba won

Match 103
Inter Zone Challenge Week
8 December 2018
21:00

Telugu Titans	36–26	Jaipur Pink Panthers
	Report

Telugu Titans won

Match 104
Inter Zone Challenge Week
9 December 2018
20:00

Tamil Thalaivas	24–37	Jaipur Pink Panthers
	Report

Jaipur Pink Panthers won

Match 105
Inter Zone Challenge Week
9 December 2018
21:00

Telugu Titans	35–31	Haryana Steelers
	Report

Telugu Titans won

Match 106
11 December 2018
20:00

Dabang Delhi	19–44	U Mumba
	Report

U Mumba won

Match 107
11 December 2018
21:00

Telugu Titans	20–27	UP Yoddha
	Report

UP Yoddha won

Match 108
12 December 2018
20:00

Haryana Steelers	37–47	Gujarat Fortune Giants
	Report

Gujarat Fortune Giants won

Match 109
12 December 2018
21:00

Telugu Titans	24–37	Bengaluru Bulls
	Report

Bengaluru Bulls won

Match 110
13 December 2018
20:00

Telugu Titans	41–36	Patna Pirates
	Report

Telugu Titans won

=== Leg 11 – Tau Devilal Sports Complex, Panchkula ===
Match 111
14 December 2018
20:00

Jaipur Pink Panthers	36–23	Puneri Paltan
	Report

Jaipur Pink Panthers won

Match 112
14 December 2018
21:00

Bengal Warriors	28–21	Tamil Thalaivas
	Report

Bengal Warriors won

Match 113
15 December 2018
20:00

UP Yoddha	25–25	Tamil Thalaivas
	Report

Match tied

Match 114
15 December 2018
21:00

Jaipur Pink Panthers	35–35	U Mumba
	Report

Match tied

Match 115
16 December 2018
20:00

Patna Pirates	31–47	UP Yoddha
	Report

UP Yoddha won

Match 116
16 December 2018
21:00

Jaipur Pink Panthers	29–34	Gujarat Fortune Giants
	Report

Gujarat Fortune Giants won

Match 117
18 December 2018
20:00

Bengaluru Bulls	44–28	Telugu Titans
	Report

Bengaluru Bulls won

Match 118
18 December 2018
21:00

Jaipur Pink Panthers	39–30	Haryana Steelers
	Report

Jaipur Pink Panthers won

Match 119
19 December 2018
20:00

Patna Pirates	40–40	Bengaluru Bulls
	Report

Match tied

Match 120
19 December 2018
21:00

Jaipur Pink Panthers	31–33	Gujarat Fortune Giants
	Report

Gujarat Fortune Giants won

Match 121
20 December 2018
20:00

Jaipur Pink Panthers	37–37	Dabang Delhi
	Report

Match tied

=== Leg 12 – Netaji Subhas Chandra Bose Indoor Stadium, Kolkata ===
21 December 2018
20:00

Bengal Warriors	27–24	Tamil Thalaivas
	Report

Match 123
Inter Zone Wildcard Match
21 December 2018
21:00

Puneri Paltan	35–20	Telugu Titans
	Report

Puneri Paltan won

Match 123
Inter Zone Wildcard Match
22 December 2018
20:00

U Mumba	32–34	UP Yoddha
	Report

UP Yoddha won

Match 124
22 December 2018
21:00

Bengal Warriors	39–23	Patna Pirates
	Report

Bengal Warriors won

Match 125
Inter Zone Wildcard Match
23 December 2018
20:00

Bengal Warriors	31–37	Dabang Delhi
	Report

Dabang Delhi won

Match 127
Inter Zone Wildcard Match
25 December 2018
20:00

Haryana Steelers	40–40	Tamil Thalaivas
	Report

Match tied

Match 128
25 December 2018
21:00

Bengal Warriors	39–34	Telugu Titans
	Report

Bengal Warriors won

Match 129
Inter Zone Wildcard Match
26 December 2018
20:00

Gujarat Fortune Giants	37–29	Patna Pirates
	Report

Gujarat Fortune Giants won

Match 130
26 December 2018
21:00

Bengal Warriors	37–31	Bengaluru Bulls
	Report

Bengal Warriors won

Match 131
Inter Zone Wildcard Match
27 December 2018
20:00

Jaipur Pink Panthers	32–40	Bengaluru Bulls
	Report

Bengaluru Bulls won

Match 132
27 December 2018
21:00

Bengal Warriors	25–41	UP Yoddha
	Report

UP Yoddha won

== Playoffs ==
=== Bracket ===
Elimination finals
A2	U Mumba	29
B3	UP Yoddha	34
A3	Dabang Delhi	39
B2	Bengal Warriors	28

Major/Minor semifinal
B1	Bengaluru Bulls	41
A1	Gujarat Giants	29
UP Yoddha	45
Dabang Delhi	33

Preliminary final
Gujarat Giants	38
UP Yoddha	31

Grand Final
Bengaluru Bulls	38
Gujarat Giants	33

=== Eliminator 1 – Rajiv Gandhi Indoor Stadium, Kochi ===
Match 133
30 December 2018
20:00 (IST)

U Mumba	29–34	UP Yoddha
	Report

UP Yoddha won

=== Eliminator 2 – Rajiv Gandhi Indoor Stadium, Kochi ===
Match 134
30 December 2018
21:00 (IST)

Dabang Delhi	39–28	Bengal Warriors
	Report

Dabang Delhi won

=== Qualifier 1 – Rajiv Gandhi Indoor Stadium, Kochi ===
Match 135
31 December 2018
20:00 (IST)

Gujarat Fortune Giants	29–41	Bengaluru Bulls
	Report

Bengaluru Bulls won

=== Eliminator 3 – Rajiv Gandhi Indoor Stadium, Kochi ===
Match 136
31 December 2018
21:00 (IST)

UP Yoddha	45–33	Dabang Delhi
	Report

UP Yoddha won

=== Qualifier 2 – Dome@NSCI SVP Stadium, Mumbai ===
Match 137
3 January 2019
20:00 (IST)

Gujarat Fortune Giants	38–31	UP Yoddha
	Report

Gujarat Fortune Giants won

=== Final – Dome@NSCI SVP Stadium, Mumbai ===
Match 138
5 January 2019
20:00 (IST)

Bengaluru Bulls	38–33	Gujarat Fortune Giants
	Report

Bengaluru Bulls won
