= Parvesh Bhainswal =

Indian kabaddi player

Personal information
- Nationality: Indian
- Born: 12 April 1997 (age 29)

Sport
- Country: India
- Sport: Kabaddi
- League: Pro Kabaddi League
- Team: Jaipur Pink Panthers (2016); Gujarat Giants (2017–2021); Telugu Titans (2022–2023); U Mumba (2024–present)
Medal record
Men's kabaddi
Representing India
Asian Games
Gold medal – first place	2022 Hangzhou	Team
South Asian Games
Gold medal – first place	2019 Kathmandu-Pokhara	Team

Parvesh Bhainswal (born 12 April 1997) is an Indian professional kabaddi player who plays as a defender. He currently plays for U Mumba in the Pro Kabaddi League. He was selected for the Indian team for the 2022 and 2023 Asian Games.

== Early life ==
Parvesh hails from Bhainswal village, Sonipat district, Haryana. The village has produced many sportspersons. He played for Income Tax and Railway teams in the domestic tournaments. Inspired by his brothers, Parvesh took up the game at the age of 11.

== Career ==
Parvesh played the Under-14 school games and later in the university tournament, he was spotted by coach Jaivir Sharma. Later, he joined Sports Authority of India, Gandhinagar. In 2023, he was part of the Indian team that won gold in the finals of the delayed 2022 Asian Games. They beat Iran in a controversial final 33–29.

In 2022, he played for Telugu Titans in the Pro Kabaddi League and as a left cover, the defender got the Titans six High 5s in 21 matches. Telugu Titans have retained Parvesh at the August 2023 Auctions for PKL 10.
