= Philkeram Johnson =

Philkeram Johnson S.A. Φίλκεραμ Johnson Α.Ε.
- Company type: Anonymi Etairia
- Industry: Building Materials
- Founded: November 1961
- Founder: Giorgos Philippou
- Defunct: November 2011
- Headquarters: Thessaloniki, Greece
- Area served: Worldwide
- Key people: Giorgos Philippou (CEO); Christina Philippou (Vice-President)
- Revenue: €55 million (2007)
- Total assets: €70 million (2007)
- Number of employees: 400 (2007)
- Parent: Norcros plc (50%)
- Subsidiaries: Industrial Mining S.A., Hippocampos S.A.

Philkeram Johnson was a Greek ceramic tile manufacturer. It was a pioneering and significant player in the European ceramic tiles industry for 50 years, established in 1961 in Thessaloniki and ceasing operations in 2011. The company was founded by the Philippou and Constantopoulos families and was the first and largest manufacturer of ceramic tiles in Greece.

At its peak in 2007, the Philkeram Johnson Group employed 400 people, had annual revenues of €55 million and an annual production of 4.5m sq.m. of ceramic tiles, with ~30% of production exported to 29 countries. It had ~10% domestic market share in Greece & Cyprus (~50% for pool tiles) and ~40% aided brand awareness.

The company was trusted for quality by major construction companies for landmark projects, such as Dubai International Airport, London Underground, 2004 Summer Olympics, 2012 Summer Olympics, 2000 Summer Olympics, Athens International Airport, and Athens Metro.

== History ==
=== Foundation and 1960s ===
Philkeram Johnson was established in 1961 in Pylaia, Thessaloniki, an area recovering from the catastrophic effects of the Greek civil war. During the post-war reconstruction period, Greece met its small needs for ceramic tiles by importing them from Italy and Spain. The Philippou family, devoted to the ceramic art for more than 120 years—first in Syros & Sifnos, then in Thessaloniki in the bricks and roof tile business—studied the market needs and established Philkeram in 1961. The name Philkeram is derived from the first letters of “Philippou” and “Keramika” (the Greek word for ceramics). Led by its founder, George Philippou, who had returned from his studies in Belgium and the UK, Philkeram’s ceramic specialists proceeded to design and produce a high-level product: the earthenware tile.

The successful operation of Philkeram during its first two years of existence drew the attention of international investors. In 1963, the English company Richard Tiles Ltd became a 50% partner in the company, renaming it to Philkeram – Richards S.A. This partnership tripled production and substantially increased the company’s exports. In 1966, Philkeram - Richards S.A. introduced the embossed tile, thereby increasing its exports to the EU and the Middle East. To meet the increased demand, the company invested in new equipment and quadrupled its staff.

In 1969, Richard Tiles Ltd merged with H & R Johnson Ltd, leading to another name change to Philkeram Johnson. The invested capital reached ~$3m USD (~$25-30m in 2024 USD), while the ownership structure remained the same. By then, the staff had grown to 350 people, and the company’s facilities covered 21K m².

=== 1970s & 1980s ===
In 1979, H & R Johnson was acquired by Nocros Plc, which continues to own 50% of Philkeram - Johnson S.A. In 1982, Industrial Mining S.A. was founded to produce and market building materials, specializing in tile adhesives and grouts.

Initially, Philkeram Johnson produced only white square tiles (15x15 cm), but soon expanded to other colors. The installation of decorative machines allowed the company to offer a wider range of designs and colors, leading to the first exports. Development continued with the production of wall tiles of various dimensions and experimentation with tiles and flooring production.

After extensive research and testing, production began in new facilities in 1982, which offered flexibility in production and a significant quality advantage. This set the stage for subsequent development in single-fired technology, completed in August 1988. The single-fired tile production method, based on Western European technology, is automated and produces high-quality products, primarily used for indoor and outdoor flooring.

In 1987, the company heavily invested in new technology, and the same year, introduced Kerastar, floor tiles for special purposes made with the most innovative global technological developments, exceeding even the highest standards. Philkeram Johnson participated in the tile exhibition in Los Angeles in 1987 and won second prize among 400 exhibitors, thus entering the U.S. market.

=== 1990s & 2000s ===
In 1994, Hippocampus S.A. was founded to focus on producing specialized tile for pools and ornamental tiles. This sector required strict adherence to basic standards of safety and hygiene. By the mid 2000s, Hippocampus had ~50% market share in the Greek pool market. Two years later, Philkeram Johnson was certified with ISO:9002, while Industrial Mining with ISO:9001.

In 2003, the “Jumpo I” production line was installed, an investment of ~€6 million that radically changed the company’s production structure. Five years later, in 2008, the “Jumpo II” production line was installed, an investment of ~€6 million, debuting in October 2008 at an event attended by the Minister of Development. Each investment led to operating cost improvements that led to payback of the investment within 18 months.

=== 2008 financial crisis ===
Greece was severely impacted by the 2008 financial crisis, leading to the Greek government-debt crisis, which led to a sharp contraction of domestic GDP by ~25% by 2011. The construction market was adversely impacted, leading to the contractions of the Greek tiles market by ~90% in the same period. As Philkeram Johnson was ~70% exposed to this market for its production, the crisis led to its bankruptcy by November 2011.

2008

- Revenue: The company’s revenue fell to €30 million in 2008, a decrease of €4 million or 12%.
- Energy Costs: Energy costs surged from €4 million in 2007 to €6 million in 2008, an increase of 32%
- Financial Costs: Financial expenses rose from €2 million in 2007 to €3 million in 2008, an increase of 18%
- Net Income: Reported a net loss of €5 million in 2008

2009

- Revenue: Sales decreased by €6 million (21%), falling to €24 million from €30 million in 2008
- Energy Costs: Energy costs decreased by 17%, providing some relief
- Financial Costs: Financial expenses totaled €2 million
- Net Income: Reported a net loss of €6 million

2010

- Revenue: Sales plummeted to €14 million, a decrease of €10 million or 41%
- Energy Costs: The cost of energy rose by 34%
- Financial Costs: Financial expenses were €2 million
- Net Income: Reported a net loss of €8 million

Failing to convince lenders of a restructuring plan that would shut down production and refocus on the retail market, the company declared bankruptcy in late Q4 2011. After years of struggles to sell the company's assets, in February 2023, the company's main asset, ~150K sqm of land in Pylaia, Thessaloniki, was sold to Acsion Ltd, a South-African real estate investment company. The land will be redeveloped into a mixed-use residential and commercial space.
