= Narender Kandola =

Indian kabaddi player

Narender
Personal information
- Born: 7 October 2000 (age 25)

Sport
- Country: India
- Sport: Kabaddi
- Position: Raider
- League: Pro Kabaddi League
- Team: Tamil Thalaivas
Medal record
Men's Kabaddi
Representing India
Junior World Kabaddi Championship
Gold medal – first place	2nd Junior World Kabaddi Championship	2023 Urmia,(Iran)

Narender Kandola (born 7 October 2000) is an Indian professional kabaddi player who plays as Raider in Pro Kabaddi League for Tamil Thalaivas. He was part of the Indian team that won the gold medal at the 2023 2nd Junior World Kabaddi Championship, Urmia (Iran).

== Career ==
Kandola played in national games for Haryana. He made his debut in 2022 Pro Kabaddi League. He is currently playing for Tamil Thalaivas in Pro Kabaddi League.
