= Nitin Rawal =

Indian kabaddi player

Personal information
- Born: 4 April 1996 (age 30)

Sport
- Country: India
- Sport: Kabaddi
- League: Pro Kabaddi league
- Team: Bengaluru Bulls(2017-21) Haryana Steelers(2022) Bengaluru Bulls(2024- Present)
Medal record
Men's Kabaddi
Representing India
Asian Games
| Gold medal – first place | 2022 Hangzhou | Team |

Nitin Rawal (born 4 April 1996) is an Indian kabaddi player from Haryana who plays in the Pro Kabaddi League (PKL) as an all rounder. In 2023, he was part of the Indian team at the 2022 Asian Games; that won gold, controversially defeating Iran 33–29 in the finals.

== Early life and background ==
Rawal hails from Baapauli village in the Panipat district, Haryana. He started playing cricket at an early age but shifted to kabaddi after encouragement from his family.

== Career ==
For the 2023 PKL Season 10, Bengal Warriors brought Rawal for Rs.30 lakhs. He previously played for the Jaipur Pink Panthers, and was also transferred to the Haryana Steelers.
