= Indigo Paints =

Indian paint company

Indigo Paints Limited
- Formerly: Indigo Paints Private Limited (2000–2020)
- Type: Public
- Traded as: BSE: 543258; NSE: INDIGOPNTS
- ISIN: INE09VQ01012
- Industry: Chemicals
- Founded: 2000; 26 years ago
- Founder: Hemant Jalan (Managing Director & Chairman)
- Headquarters: Pune, Maharashtra, India
- Key people: Chetan Humane (Chief Financial Officer); Suresh Babu (Chief Operating Officer)
- Products: Exterior and Interior paints; Enamel Paints; Wood Coatings; Putties; Primers
- Revenue: ▲₹1,073 crore (US$110 million) (2023)
- Number of employees: 650 (2021)
- Website: indigopaints.com

Indigo Paints Limited is an Indian paint company that is headquartered in Pune, Maharashtra, and has five manufacturing facilities that are located at Jodhpur, Kochi and Pudukkottai. The company is engaged in manufacturing, selling and distribution of decorative paints, Emulsion, enamels, waterproofing & chemical constructions, wood coatings, distemper, primers, putties and cement paints.

== History ==
In 2000, Hemant Jalan founded Indigo Paints to manufacture cement paint; by 2021 the company scaled up to become the fifth largest player in terms of revenue generation in the decorative paint industry. In December 2019, Jalan stated that the company had established a distribution network across 27 states and seven union territories. In 2018, Mahendra Singh Dhoni became the company’s brand ambassador. In 2014, Sequoia Capital first invested ₹55 crore in the firm and later in 2016, an additional ₹95 crore in 2016. In 2021, as a part of its IPO, the firm raised ₹348 crore from 25 anchor investors including the Government of Singapore, Fidelity, Goldman Sachs, Nomura, HSBC, Pacific Horizon Investment Trust, SBI Mutual Fund, ICICI Prudential Mutual Fund and Axis Mutual Fund. In 2022, company onboarded Mohanlal as a brand ambassador for promoting its products in the state of Kerala. In 2023, Indigo Paints forayed into the waterproofing and construction chemicals segments, with the acquisition of 51 percent stake in Apple Chemie India Private Ltd (ACIPL).

== Initial public offering ==
On 20 January 2021, Indigo Paints launched its initial public offering (IPO) of about 1170 crores; the price band was fixed at ₹1,488-1,490 apiece. The issue was oversubscribed by 117 times. On February, 2 2021, Indigo Paints Limited made its debut on the NSE and the BSE at a price of ₹2,607.5 per share, a 75 percent premium over its issue price of ₹1,490. On the listing day, the stock price more than doubled to hit the upper circuit at ₹3,129 per share.
