= Finolex Group =

Indian conglomerate company pvt ltd

- Type: Private
- Founded: 1958
- Founder: P. P. Chhabria; K. P. Chhabria
- Headquarters: Pune, India
- Revenue: ₹3,254.77 crore (US$340 million)
- Subsidiaries: Finolex Cables Ltd; Finolex Industries Ltd; Finolex J-Power Systems Ltd; Finolex Plasson Industries Ltd
- Website: www.finolex.com

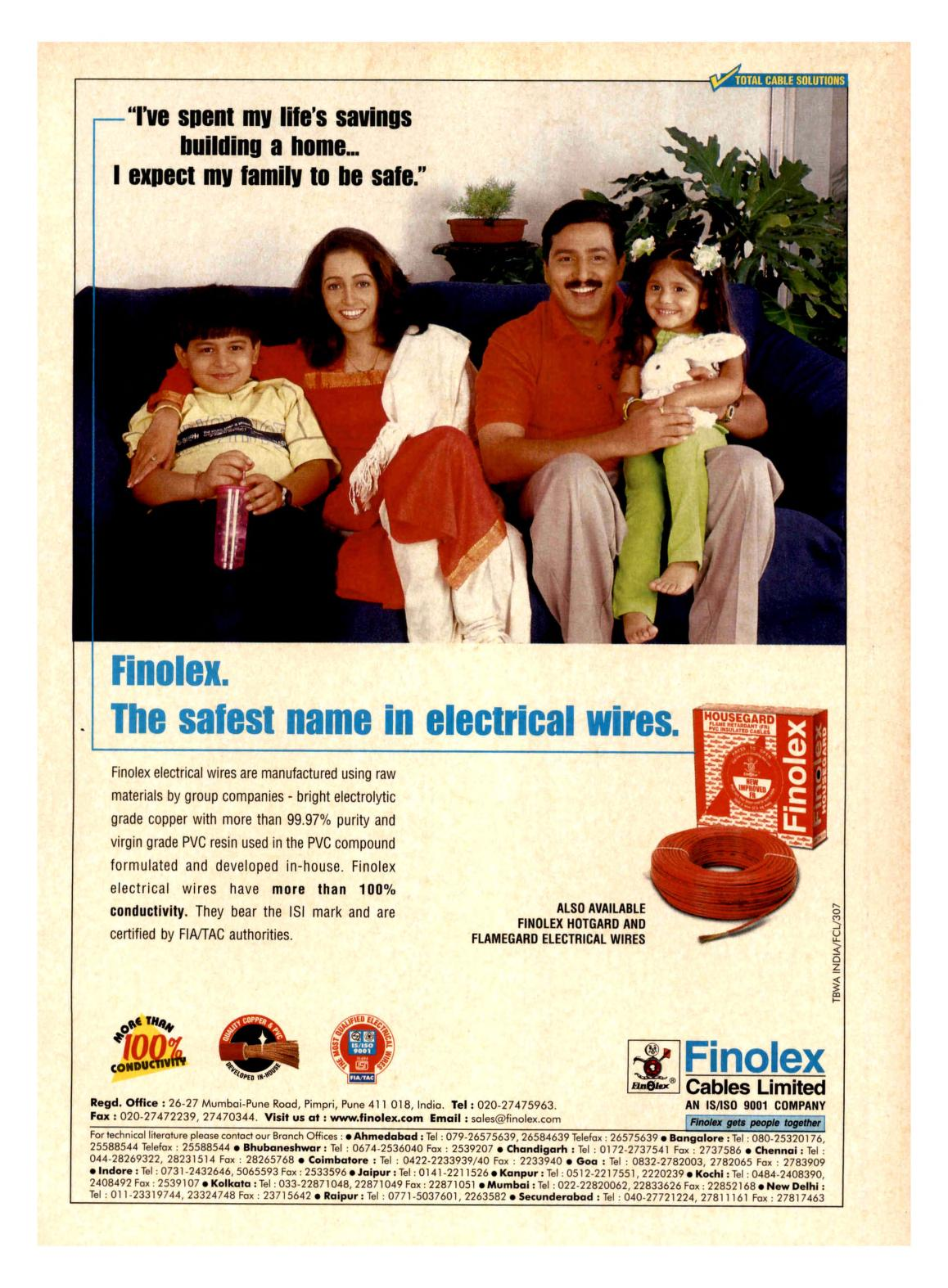
Finolex Cables advertisement

Finolex Group is an Indian conglomerate company based in Pune, India. The Finolex Group comprises Finolex Cables Ltd., Finolex Industries Ltd., Finolex J-Power Systems Ltd. and Finolex Plasson Industries Ltd. The group was founded in 1958 by P. P. Chhabria and K. P. Chhabria. The Finolex brand was intuitive from “Fine” and “Flexibles” and “O” with an electric arc across it – suggesting the electrical cable business the company was in.
