= Tamil Thalaivas =

Professional Kabaddi team based in Tamil Nadu, India

- Full name: Tamil Thalaivas
- Sport: Kabaddi
- Founded: 2017
- First season: 2017
- Last season: 2024
- League: PKL
- Based in: Chennai, Tamil Nadu
- Stadium: Jawaharlal Nehru Stadium, Chennai
- Colours
- Anthem: Namma Mannu Namma Velayattu
- Owner: Magnum Sports
- Head coach: TBA
- Captain: Arjun Deshwal
- Playoff berths: 1
- Website: www.tamilthalaivas.club

Tamil Thalaivas is an Indian professional kabaddi franchise based in Chennai, Tamil Nadu. The team competes in the Pro Kabaddi League and was one of the four new franchises added when the league was expanded in 2017. The team plays its home matches at the Jawaharlal Nehru Indoor Stadium in Chennai and is owned by Magnum Sports.

The franchise has qualified for the play-offs only once in the 2022 season. Sanjeev Baliyan was appointed as the coach and Suresh Kumar as assistant coach ahead of the 2025 season. Arjun Deshwal serves as the captain of the team.

== Background ==
The Pro Kabaddi League was conceived as a franchise-based kabaddi tournament, based on the success of the Indian Premier League cricket tournament. Its first season was held in 2014 with eight teams. In March 2017, the league announced the addition of four more team from fifth season, one of which was based in Tamil Nadu. Kabaddi is the state game of Tamil Nadu. The team is owned by Magnum sports.

== History ==
=== Early Years (2017–20) ===
The franchise was named as "Tamil Thalaivas", ahead of the start of the fifth season. In the auction for the 2017 season, Thalaivas picked up then India national kabaddi team captain Ajay Thakur for ₹6.93 million (US$72,000) and defender Amit Hooda for ₹6.3 million (US$65,000). The teams were divided into two zones with the Thalaivas placed in zone B and each team played 15 intra-zonal matches and 7 inter-zonal matches. The team registered their first win against the Bengaluru Bulls on 10 August. The team finished bottom of the table with six wins from 22 matches and failed to advance to the play-offs.

The team retained four players including Ajay Thakur and Amit Hooda ahead of the auction for the 2018-19 season. The franchise also bought Sukesh Hegde, Darshan and Manjeet Chillar in the auction. E Bhaskaran replaced Kasinatha Baskaran as the head coach. The team had another disappointing season and finished bottom of zone B with just five wins. Following the poor season, coach Bhaskaran stepped down and was replaced by J. Udayakumar.

Ahead of the 2019 season, Thalaivas retained three players including Ajay Thakur and Manjeet Chhillar. In the auction, the franchise bought Rahul Chaudhari for ₹9.4 million (US$98,000) and seven other players. Despite the presence of star raiders in Thakur and Chaudhari, the team won only four matches and finished bottom of the table with 37 points.

=== Moving up the table and first play-offs (2021-2023) ===
The next season was delayed till December 2021 due to COVID-19 pandemic. In the auction, the Thalaivas picked up raiders Manjeet, Prapanjan and defender Surjeet Singh for a combined ₹23.8 million (US$250,000). However, the team had another poor season and finished 11th amongst the 12 teams with five wins and 47 points.

Ahead of the 2022 season, the team bought Indian captain and top raider Pawan Sehrawat for ₹26 million (US$270,000). However, Sehrawat had an ACL injury in the first match and was ruled out of the entire season. The team won only one match in the first six matches, which led to the sacking of the head coach Udayakumar and Ashan Kumar was appointed as the new coach of the team. The team had a revival in form and finished with ten wins from 22 matches. With a fifth-place finish, the team qualified for the play-offs for the first time. The team won the first eliminator against the UP Yoddha in extra time before losing to eventual champions Puneri Paltan in the semifinals by a score of 37–39.

The team released Sehrawat before the auctions but retained most of the other players. The franchise bought only four players at the auction before the 2023-24 season. The team score nine wins but failed to advance to the playoffs after finishing in ninth place. The highlight of the season was the 74–37 win over the Bengal Warriors on 18 February 2024. Multiple records were broken in the match including the most points scored (111) in a single match and the most number of all-outs (6).

=== Later Years (2024-Present) ===
Ahead of the 2024 season, Ashan Kumar was replaced by J. Udhayakumar as the head coach and Dharmaraj Cheralathan was appointed as the strategy coach. The team retained core players from the previous season and bought Sachin Tanwar for ₹21.5 million (US$220,000) in the auction. Sagar Rathee was retained as the captain of the team. The team finished ninth in the points table with eight wins from 22 matches and failed to qualify for the playoffs. Nitesh Kumar finished amongst the top five defenders with the most tackle points.

Ahead of the 2025 Pro Kabaddi League season, Sanjeev Baliyan was appointed as the head coach. Ahead of the new season, the Thalaivas retained ten players from their existing roster including captain Sagar, young raider Narender Kandola, and a lone overseas player in Iranian Moien Shafaghi. In the subsequent auction, the Thalaivas bought Arjun Deshwal for ₹14 million (US$150,000) and Pawan Sehrawat for ₹5.95 million (US$62,000). Sehrawat and Deshwal were named captain and vice-captain of the side respectively. However, Sehrawat was released mid-way through the season due to disciplinary issues, and Deshwal was named captain.

== Players ==
=== Current Squad ===
Tamil Thalaivas squad
No.	Name	Nationality	Position
2	Arjun Deshwal (c)	India	Raider
1	Vishal Chahal	India	Right Raider
8	Narender Kandola	India	Left Raider
	Rohit Beniwal	India	Left Raider
	Abhiraj Pawar	India	Left Raider
	Yogesh Yadav	India	Raider
93	Dhiraj Balimare	India	Raider
	Suresh Yadav	India	All-Rounder
19	Moein Safaghi	Iran	All-Rounder
13	Sagar Rathee	India	Defender - Right Corner
9	Himanshu	India	Defender - Left Corner
4	Nitesh Kumar	India	Defender - Left Corner
	Mohit	India	Defender - Left Corner
	Alireza Khalili	Iran	Defender - Right Corner
5	Aashish	India	Defender - Left Cover
11	Anuj Gawade	India	Defender - Left Cover
6	Ronak	India	Defender - Right Cover
	Tarun	India	Defender - Right Cover
17	~~Pawan Sehrawat~~	India	All-Rounder

Updated: 1 June 2025

== Administration ==
- Shushen Vashishth, CEO
- Sanjeev Baliyan, Head coach

=== Head coaches ===
Name	Nationality	From	To
K. Baskaran	India	2017	2018
E. Baskaran	India	2018	2019
J. Udayakumar	India	2021	2022
Ashan Kumar	India	2022	2024
J. Udayakumar	India	2024	2025
Sanjeev Baliyan	India	2025	2025

== Ground ==
The Thalaivas play their home matches at the Jawaharalal Nehru indoor stadium in Chennai. The stadium is owned by the Government of Tamil Nadu and has a capacity of 8000.

== Sponsors ==
Year	Season	Kit manufacturer	Main sponsor	Back sponsor	Sleeve sponsor
2017	V	Admiral	Muthoot	Maha Cement	Agni Devices
2018	VI	Admiral	Orbit Cables	Valvoline	Asian Paints
2019	VII	Kaizen	Celon Labs		
2021	VIII	Trak-Only	Parimatch News	Iodex	Nippon Paint
2022	IX	Trak-Only	DafaNews	Kajaria	Nippon Paint
2023	X	Trak-Only	1xBat	Kick-EV	Nippon Paint
2024	XI	Shiv-Naresh	1xBat	MyMaster11	Freemans
2025	XII	Shiv-Naresh	BGauss	ARS Green Steel	Spinner

== Records ==
Updated: 21 May 2025

Seasons	Total	Wins	Tied	Losses	% Win	Position
Season 5	22	6	2	14	27.27%	6
Season 6	22	5	4	13	22.72%	6
Season 7	22	4	3	15	18.18%	12
Season 8	22	5	6	11	22.72%	11
Season 9	22	10	4	7	45.45%	5
Season 10	22	9	0	13	40.90%	9
Season 11	22	8	1	13	36.36%	9

=== By opposition ===
Updated:1 October 2024

Opposition	Played	Won	Lost	Drawn	% Win
Bengal Warriors	13	2	10	1	15.38%
Bengaluru Bulls	14	3	11	0	21.42%
Dabang Delhi	9	2	5	2	22.22%
Gujarat Fortune Giants	9	3	5	1	33.33%
Haryana Steelers	11	2	6	3	18.18%
Jaipur Pink Panthers	9	2	5	2	22.22%
Patna Pirates	14	4	7	3	28.57%
Puneri Paltan	10	3	5	2	30.0%
Telugu Titans	14	8	5	1	57.14%
U Mumba	10	2	7	1	20.0%
UP Yoddha	14	6	5	3	42.85%
Total	127	37	71	19	29.13%
