= Jaipur Pink Panthers =

Professional kabaddi team based in Jaipur, India

- Full name: Jaipur Pink Panthers
- Short name: JPP
- Sport: Kabaddi
- First season: 2014
- Last season: 2024
- League: PKL
- Based in: Jaipur
- Stadium: Sawai Mansingh Indoor Stadium (2,000)
- Colours
- Anthem: Sunny Subramanian
- Owner: Abhishek Bachchan
- Head coach: Narender Redhu
- Captain: (India) Nitin Rawal
- Championships: (2014, 2022)
- Team title: 2
- Playoff berths: 6
- Website: Jaipur Pink Panthers

Uniforms
Home	Away

Jaipur Pink Panthers (JPP) is a professional kabaddi team from Jaipur that competes in the Pro Kabaddi League. The team is owned by Bollywood actor Abhishek Bachchan and plays its home matches at Sawai Mansingh Indoor Stadium. It is currently captained by Nitin Rawal and coached by Narender Redhu. JPP won the inaugural season of the PKL in 2014, adding another title in 2022. Its two titles are the second most in league history.

The team's celebrity ownership has attracted media attention and a celebrity following. On 4 December 2020, Amazon Prime Video released Sons of the Soil, a series following the team and its players throughout the 2019 Pro Kabaddi League season.

== Team identity ==
The team's motto is "Roar for the Panthers" and its official colours are pink and blue.

=== Name and logo ===
The team name is a reference to the Friz Freleng cartoon character Pink Panther. In the inaugural season, the logo featured an illustration of a muscular pink panther with a smiling face. In 2015, the design was updated leading to the current logo.

Old logo, used during the inaugural season.

== Current squad ==
Jaipur Pink Panthers squad 2025
No	Name	Nat	Position
14	Nitin Rawal (c)	(India)	All-Rounder
1	Reza Mirbagheri (vc)	(Iran)	Defender
3	Manjeet Dahiya	(India)	Raider
9	Sombir Mehra	(India)	Raider
2	Meetu Sharma	(India)	Raider
55	Vinay Redhu	(India)	Raider
45	Ritik Sharma	(India)	Raider
	Sahil Satpal	(India)	Raider
	Uday Parte	(India)	Raider
9	Nitin Kumar	(India)	Right Raider
22	Ali Choubtarash	(Iran)	Raider
65	Nitin Kumar	(India)	Defender - Right Cover
	Ashish Bambal	(India)	Defender - Right Cover
	Mohit	(India)	Defender - Right Cover
4	Abhishek KS	(India)	Defender - Left Cover
	Sahil Deswal	(India)	Defender - Left Cover
7	Ronak Singh	(India)	Defender - Right Corner
	Deepanshu Khatri	(India)	Defender - Right Corner
	Aryan Kumar	(India)	Defender - Left Corner
Source: Pro Kabaddi

== Seasons ==
=== Season I ===
Jaipur finished first in the league stage and won the championship beating U Mumba in the finals.

Team	Pld	W	L	D	SD	Pts
Jaipur Pink Panthers (C)	14	10	3	1	100	54
U Mumba (R)	14	8	3	3	59	51
Bengaluru Bulls (4)	14	8	5	1	36	47
Patna Pirates (3)	14	7	5	2	18	45
Telugu Titans	14	6	5	3	26	42
Dabang Delhi KC	14	5	8	1	-27	32
Bengal Warriors	14	4	9	1	-85	24
Puneri Paltan	14	2	12	0	-127	17

Source: ProKabaddi

(C) Champion; (R) Runners-up; (3) Third Place; (4) Fourth Place.

- Advanced to the Playoff Stage
- Five points for a win
- Three points each for a drawn game
- One point for a loss by 7 points or fewer
- Top 4 teams qualified for the semifinals

=== Season II ===
This season Jaipur Pink Panthers finished the league at the 5th position.

Team	Pld	W	L	D	SD	Pts
U Mumba (C)	14	12	2	0	40	60
Telugu Titans (3)	14	8	3	3	85	50
Bengaluru Bulls (R)	14	9	5	0	55	48
Patna Pirates (4)	14	7	6	1	-18	41
Jaipur Pink Panthers	14	6	7	1	43	38
Bengal Warriors	14	4	9	1	-63	27
Dabang Delhi KC	14	4	9	1	-68	27
Puneri Paltan	14	2	11	1	-74	21

Source: ProKabaddi
(C) Champion; (R) Runners-up; (3) Third Place; (4) Fourth Place.

- Advanced to the Playoff Stage
- Five points for a win
- Three points each for a drawn game
- One point for a loss by 7 points or fewer

=== Season III ===
Team	Pld	W	L	D	SD	Pts
U Mumba (R)	14	12	2	0	95	60
Patna Pirates (C)	14	10	2	2	104	58
Puneri Paltan (3)	14	7	4	3	92	48
Bengal Warriors (4)	14	9	5	0	26	47
Telugu Titans	14	7	7	0	-10	38
Jaipur Pink Panthers	14	4	8	2	-63	28
Bengaluru Bulls	14	2	12	0	-102	14
Dabang Delhi KC	14	1	12	1	-142	11

Source: ProKabaddi

(C) Champion; (R) Runners-up; (3) Third Place; (4) Fourth Place.

- Advanced to the Playoff Stage
- Five points for a win
- Three points each for a drawn game
- One point for a loss by 7 points or fewer

=== Season IV ===
Jaipur Pink Panther finished Runner-up in the Fourth season.

Team	Pld	W	L	D	SD	Pts
Patna Pirates (C)	14	10	4	0	14	52
Telugu Titans	14	8	4	2	67	50
Jaipur Pink Panthers (R)	14	8	5	1	22	47
Puneri Paltan	14	6	6	2	23	42
U Mumba	14	7	6	1	-18	42
Bengaluru Bulls	14	5	8	1	-55	32
Dabang Delhi KC	14	4	9	1	7	29
Bengal Warriors	14	3	9	2	-60	26

Source:www.prokabaddi.com

- Advanced to the Playoff Stage
- Five points for a win
- Three points each for a drawn game
- One point for a loss by 7 points or fewer

=== Season V ===
The teams are divided into two zones with each zone having six teams based on their geographical proximity. Each team will play 15 intra-zonal matches and 7 inter-zonal matches.
Zone A

Team	Pld	W	L	D	SD	Pts
Gujarat Fortune Giants (R)	22	15	4	3	126	87
Puneri Paltan	22	15	7	0	91	80
Haryana Steelers	22	13	5	4	40	79
U Mumba	22	10	12	0	-50	56
Jaipur Pink Panthers	22	8	13	1	-91	51
Dabang Delhi KC	22	5	16	1	-134	29

Zone B

Team	Pld	W	L	D	SD	Pts
Bengal Warriors	22	11	5	6	19	77
Patna Pirates (C)	22	10	7	5	60	71
UP Yoddha	22	8	10	4	2	60
Bengaluru Bulls	22	8	11	3	10	57
Telugu Titans	22	7	12	3	-2	52
Tamil Thalaivas	22	6	14	2	-71	46

Source: ProKabaddi

- advanced to Qualifier 1
- advanced to Eliminators
- Five points for a win
- Three points each for a drawn game
- One point for a loss by 7 points or fewer

=== Season VI ===
The teams are divided into two zones with each zone having six teams based on their geographical proximity. Each team will play 15 intra-zonal matches and 7 inter-zonal matches.
Zone A

Team	Pld	W	L	D	SD	Pts
Gujarat Fortune Giants (R)	22	17	3	2	117	93
U Mumba	22	15	5	2	189	86
Dabang Delhi KC	22	11	9	2	-1	68
Puneri Paltan	22	8	12	2	-45	52
Jaipur Pink Panthers	22	6	13	3	-69	43
Haryana Steelers	22	6	14	2	-91	42

Zone B

Team	Pld	W	L	D	SD	Pts
Bengaluru Bulls (C)	22	13	7	2	104	78
Bengal Warriors	22	12	8	2	2	69
UP Yoddha	22	8	10	4	-45	57
Patna Pirates	22	9	11	2	-36	55
Telugu Titans	22	8	13	1	-55	51
Tamil Thalaivas	22	5	13	4	-70	42

Source: ProKabaddi

- advanced to Qualifier 1
- advanced to Eliminators
- Five points for a win
- Three points each for a drawn game
- One point for a loss by 7 points or fewer
- Top three teams from each zone qualify for the playoffs

=== Season VII ===
Team	Pld	W	L	D	SD	Pts
Dabang Delhi KC (R)	22	15	4	3	66	85
Bengal Warriors (C)	22	14	5	3	71	83
UP Yoddha	22	13	7	2	9	74
U Mumba	22	12	8	2	47	72
Haryana Steelers	22	13	8	1	15	71
Bengaluru Bulls	22	11	10	1	16	64
Jaipur Pink Panthers	22	9	11	2	-13	58
Patna Pirates	22	8	13	1	29	51
Gujarat Forunte Giants	22	7	13	2	18	51
Puneri Paltan	22	7	12	3	-72	48
Telugu Titans	22	6	13	3	-67	45
Tamil Thalaivas	22	4	15	3	-119	37

Source: ProKabaddi

- advanced to Finals
- advanced to Eliminators
- Five points for a win
- Three points each for a drawn game
- One point for a loss by 7 points or fewer
- Top 6 teams qualify for the playoffs

=== Season VIII ===
Pos	Team	Pld	W	L	T	SD	Pts	
1	Patna Pirates (R)	22	16	5	1	120	86	Qualification to semi finals
2	Dabang Delhi (C)	22	12	6	4	-3	75	Qualification to semi finals
3	UP Yoddha	22	10	9	3	33	68	Qualification to eliminators
4	Gujarat Giants	22	10	8	4	2	67	Qualification to eliminators
5	Bengaluru Bulls	22	11	9	2	53	66	Qualification to eliminators
6	Puneri Paltan	22	12	9	1	33	66	Qualification to eliminators
7	Haryana Steelers	22	10	9	3	-28	64	
8	Jaipur Pink Panthers	22	10	10	2	14	63	
9	Bengal Warriors	22	9	10	3	-18	57	
10	U Mumba	22	7	10	5	-34	55	
11	Tamil Thalaivas	22	5	11	6	-42	47	
12	Telugu Titans	22	1	17	4	-130	27	

Updated to match(es) played on 25 February 2022. Source: ProKabaddi
(C) Champion; (R) Runners Up
- Five points for a win
- Three points each for a drawn game
- One point for a loss by 7 points or fewer

=== Season IX ===
Pos	Team	Pld	W	L	T	SD	Pts	
1	Jaipur Pink Panthers (C)	22	15	6	1	174	82	Qualification to semi finals
2	Puneri Paltan (R)	22	14	6	2	66	80	Qualification to semi finals
3	Bengaluru Bulls	22	13	8	1	39	74	Qualification to eliminators
4	UP Yoddha	22	12	8	2	42	71	Qualification to eliminators
5	Tamil Thalaivas	22	10	8	4	5	66	Qualification to eliminators
6	Dabang Delhi	22	10	10	2	17	63	Qualification to eliminators
7	Haryana Steelers	22	10	10	2	16	61	
8	Gujarat Giants	22	9	11	2	-16	59	
9	U Mumba	22	10	12	0	-28	56	
10	Patna Pirates	22	8	11	3	-58	54	
11	Bengal Warriors	22	8	11	3	-12	53	
12	Telugu Titans	22	2	20	0	-245	15	

Source: ProKabaddi
(C) Champion; (R) Runners Up
- 5 points for a win
- 3 points for a tied game
- 1 point for a loss by 7 points or fewer

=== Season X ===
Pos	Team	Pld	W	L	T	SD	Pts	
1	Puneri Paltan (C)	22	17	2	3	253	96	Qualification to semi finals
2	Jaipur Pink Panthers	22	16	3	3	141	92	Qualification to semi finals
3	Dabang Delhi	22	13	6	3	53	79	Qualification to eliminators
4	Gujarat Giants	22	13	9	0	32	70	Qualification to eliminators
5	Haryana Steelers (R)	22	13	8	1	-13	70	Qualification to eliminators
6	Patna Pirates	22	11	8	3	50	69	Qualification to eliminators
7	Bengal Warriors	22	9	11	2	-43	55	
8	Bengaluru Bulls	22	8	12	2	-67	53	
9	Tamil Thalaivas	22	9	13	0	32	51	
10	U Mumba	22	6	13	3	-79	45	
11	UP Yoddhas	22	4	17	1	-116	31	
12	Telugu Titans	22	2	19	1	-243	21	

Source: ProKabaddi
Rules for classification:
- 5 points for a win
- 3 points for a tied game
- 1 point for a loss by 7 points or fewer
(C) Champion; (R) Runners Up

=== Season XI ===
Pos	Team	Pld	W	L	T	SD	Pts	
1	Haryana Steelers (C)	22	16	6	0	112	84	Qualification to semi finals
2	Dabang Delhi	22	13	5	4	85	81	Qualification to semi finals
3	UP Yoddhas	22	13	6	3	97	79	Qualification to eliminators
4	Patna Pirates (R)	22	13	7	2	93	77	Qualification to eliminators
5	U Mumba	22	12	8	2	16	71	Qualification to eliminators
6	Jaipur Pink Panthers	22	12	8	2	55	70	Qualification to eliminators
7	Telugu Titans	22	12	10	0	-40	66	
8	Puneri Paltan	22	9	10	3	61	60	
9	Tamil Thalaivas	22	8	13	1	16	50	
10	Bengal Warriorz	22	5	14	3	-116	41	
11	Gujarat Giants	22	5	14	3	-152	38	
12	Bengaluru Bulls	22	2	19	1	-227	19	

Source: ProKabaddi
Rules for classification:
- 5 points for a win
- 3 points for a tied game
- 1 point for a loss by 7 points or fewer
(C) Champion; (R) Runners up

== Records ==
Seasons	Total	Wins	Tied	Losses	% Win	Position
Season 1	16	12	1	3	75.00%	Champions
Season 2	14	6	1	7	42.86%	Group stage
Season 3	14	4	2	8	28.57%	Group stage
Season 4	16	9	1	6	56.25%	Runners-up
Season 5	22	8	1	13	36.36%	Group stage
Season 6	22	6	3	13	27.27%	Group stage
Season 7	22	9	2	11	40.91%	Group stage
Season 8	22	10	2	10	45.45%	Group stage
Season 9	24	17	1	6	70.83%	Champions
Season 10	23	16	3	4	69.56%	Semifinals
Season 11	23	12	2	9	52.17%	Eliminator
Season 12	20	9	0	11	45.00%	Eliminator

=== By opposition ===
Note: Table lists in alphabetical order.

Opposition	Played	Won	Lost	Drawn	% Win
Bengal Warriors	21	10	10	1	47.6%
Bengaluru Bulls	23	11	10	2	47.8%
Dabang Delhi	25	12	10	3	48.0%
Gujarat Fortune Giants	17	9	6	2	52.9%
Haryana Steelers	18	10	6	2	55.5%
Patna Pirates	23	10	13	0	43.5%
Puneri Paltan	26	14	10	2	53.8%
Tamil Thalaivas	13	7	3	3	53.8%
Telugu Titans	22	12	9	1	54.5%
U Mumba	26	12	11	3	46.1%
UP Yoddha	15	8	7	0	53.3%
Total	229	115	95	19	50.2%

== Sponsors ==
Year	Season	Kit manufacturer	Main sponsor	Back sponsor	Sleeve sponsor
2014	I	TYKA	Magic Bus		Kalyan Jewellers
2015	II	TYKA	JioChat	Manforce	Kalyan Jewellers
2016	III	Dida	Magic Bus	Binani Cement	Daawat Basmati
2016	IV	Dida	Karbonn Mobiles	JioChat	Cycle Pure Agarbathies
2017	V	Dida	Finolex	Lux Cozi	Cycle Pure Agarbathies
2018	VI	D:FY	Finolex	Lux Cozi	Kalyan Jewellers
2019	VII	TYKA	Ambuja Cements	TVS	Justdial
2021	VIII	TYKA	Indinews	MyFab11	Herbalife Nutrition
2022	IX	TYKA	Fairplay Fantasy	DafaNews	Astro Nutrition
2023	X	TYKA	Batery	Bikaji	Naagin
2024	XI	TYKA	MelBat	Bikaji	IDFC First Bank
2025	XII	TYKA	Roff	Bikaji	InCred
