= U Mumba =

Team of PKL

- Full name: U Mumba
- Sport: Kabaddi
- Founded: 2014
- First season: 2014
- Last season: 2024
- League: PKL
- Based in: Mumbai
- Stadium: Sardar Vallabhbhai Patel Indoor Stadium (5,000)
- Colors
- Owner: Unilazer Ventures; Ronnie Screwvala
- CEO: Suhail Chandhok
- Head coach: Anil Chaprana; Parthiban M
- Captain: (India) Sunil Kumar
- Championships: (2015)
- League titles: 1
- Playoff berths: 5
- Website: www.usports.in/umumba

U Mumba is a professional kabaddi team based in Mumbai, Maharashtra, that plays in the Pro Kabaddi League. The franchise is currently led by Sunil Kumar, and coached by Anil Chaprana and Parthiban M. The team is owned by Unilazer Ventures Pvt. Ltd with co-founders Ronnie Screwvala and Supratik Sen. U Mumba play their home matches at the Sardar Vallabhbhai Patel Indoor Stadium.

In the inaugural season of the PKL, U Mumba were one of the most dominant teams in the league but lost the ultimate match of the competition, thus ending as runner's up to the Jaipur Pink Panthers. In 2015, they were out to make up for their mistakes and successfully won the tournament after defeating Bengaluru Bulls in the Final. Later next season in 2016(January), U Mumba lived up to the tag of the best team in PKL history and made their third successive PKL final before eventually ending as runner's up, as they were defeated by the Patna Pirates by a narrow margin despite a lion hearted comeback in the second half of the final.

Ahead of the June 2016 season, in the PKL auction, U Mumba lost many of their key players who were a part of the squad that reached three consecutive finals. The team wasn't able to deal with the changes as they failed to make the playoffs in the following two seasons- 2016(June) season and 2017. An inspired change of personnel by the owners ahead of the 2018-19 season, saw U Mumba regain their lost touch and qualified for the playoffs after two failed attempts. In the process U Mumba once again became the force they once were, and ended the league stage with dominant wins and the most highest score difference than any other team. But inability to peak in big games with narrow margins, saw them getting knocked out by the UP Yoddha in the playoffs.

U Mumba contest the Maharashtra derby against state rivals Puneri Paltan and have the bragging rights as well by winning 9 of the 15 encounters between the two teams.

In season 7, they went out in the 2nd semi-final losing to the eventual champions Bengal Warriors, by a score of 35–37.

== Current squad ==
Full Squad of U Mumba for Pro Kabaddi League Session 12,2025.

No	Name	Nat	Position
11	Sunil Kumar (c)	(India)	Defender
9	Ajit Chouhan	(India)	Left Raider
	Satish Kannan	(India)	Right Raider
	Mukesh Kannan	(India)	Raider
	Abhimanyu Raghuvanshi	(India)	Raider
3	Sandeep Kumar	(India)	Raider
	Amarjeet Yadav	(India)	All Rounder
	Rohit Raghav	(India)	All Rounder
	Aanil Mohan	(India)	All Rounder
21	Amirmohammad Zafardanesh	(Iran)	All Rounder
	Mohammad Ghorbani	(Iran)	All Rounder
	Vijay Kumar	(India)	Defender - Left Corner
	Lokesh Ghosliya	(India)	Defender - Left Corner
	Deepak Kundu	(India)	Defender - Left Corner
5	Parvesh Bhainswal	(India)	Defender - Left Cover
1	Rinku Sharma	(India)	Defender - Right Corner
	Ravi Bhati	(India)	Defender - Right Cover
	Mukilan Shanmugam	(India)	Defender - Left Cover
Source: Pro Kabaddi

== Seasons ==
=== Season I ===
U Mumba finished runners-up in the first season after losing to Jaipur Pink Panthers in the finals.

Team	Pld	W	L	D	SD	Pts
Jaipur Pink Panthers (C)	14	10	3	1	100	54
U Mumba (R)	14	8	3	3	59	51
Bengaluru Bulls (4)	14	8	5	1	36	47
Patna Pirates (3)	14	7	5	2	18	45
Telugu Titans	14	6	5	3	26	42
Dabang Delhi KC	14	5	8	1	-27	32
Bengal Warriors	14	4	9	1	-85	24
Puneri Paltan	14	2	12	0	-127	17

Source: ProKabaddi

(C) Champion; (R) Runners-up; (3) Third Place; (4) Fourth Place.

- Advanced to the Playoff Stage
- Five points for a win
- Three points each for a drawn game
- One point for a loss by 7 points or fewer
- Top 4 teams qualified for the semifinals

=== Season II ===
This season U Mumba finished the league as the Champions.

Team	Pld	W	L	D	SD	Pts
U Mumba (C)	14	12	2	0	40	60
Telugu Titans (3)	14	8	3	3	85	50
Bengaluru Bulls (R)	14	9	5	0	55	48
Patna Pirates (4)	14	7	6	1	-18	41
Jaipur Pink Panthers	14	6	7	1	43	38
Bengal Warriors	14	4	9	1	-63	27
Dabang Delhi KC	14	4	9	1	-68	27
Puneri Paltan	14	2	11	1	-74	21

Source: ProKabaddi
(C) Champion; (R) Runners-up; (3) Third Place; (4) Fourth Place.

- Advanced to the Playoff Stage
- Five points for a win
- Three points each for a drawn game
- One point for a loss by 7 points or fewer

=== Season III ===
Team	Pld	W	L	D	SD	Pts
U Mumba (R)	14	12	2	0	95	60
Patna Pirates (C)	14	10	2	2	104	58
Puneri Paltan (3)	14	7	4	3	92	48
Bengal Warriors (4)	14	9	5	0	26	47
Telugu Titans	14	7	7	0	-10	38
Jaipur Pink Panthers	14	4	8	2	-63	28
Bengaluru Bulls	14	2	12	0	-102	14
Dabang Delhi KC	14	1	12	1	-142	11

Source: ProKabaddi

(C) Champion; (R) Runners-up; (3) Third Place; (4) Fourth Place.

- Advanced to the Playoff Stage
- Five points for a win
- Three points each for a drawn game
- One point for a loss by 7 points or fewer

=== Season IV ===
Team	Pld	W	L	D	SD	Pts
Patna Pirates (C)	14	10	4	0	14	52
Telugu Titans	14	8	4	2	67	50
Jaipur Pink Panthers (R)	14	8	5	1	22	47
Puneri Paltan	14	6	6	2	23	42
U Mumba	14	7	6	1	-18	42
Bengaluru Bulls	14	5	8	1	-55	32
Dabang Delhi KC	14	4	9	1	7	29
Bengal Warriors	14	3	9	2	-60	26

Source:www.prokabaddi.com

- Advanced to the Playoff Stage
- Five points for a win
- Three points each for a drawn game
- One point for a loss by 7 points or fewer

=== Season V ===
The teams are divided into two zones with each zone having six teams based on their geographical proximity. Each team will play 15 intra-zonal matches and 7 inter-zonal matches.
Zone A

Team	Pld	W	L	D	SD	Pts
Gujarat Fortune Giants (R)	22	15	4	3	126	87
Puneri Paltan	22	15	7	0	91	80
Haryana Steelers	22	13	5	4	40	79
U Mumba	22	10	12	0	-50	56
Jaipur Pink Panthers	22	8	13	1	-91	51
Dabang Delhi KC	22	5	16	1	-134	29

Zone B

Team	Pld	W	L	D	SD	Pts
Bengal Warriors	22	11	5	6	19	77
Patna Pirates (C)	22	10	7	5	60	71
UP Yoddha	22	8	10	4	2	60
Bengaluru Bulls	22	8	11	3	10	57
Telugu Titans	22	7	12	3	-2	52
Tamil Thalaivas	22	6	14	2	-71	46

Source: ProKabaddi

- advanced to Qualifier 1
- advanced to Eliminators
- Five points for a win
- Three points each for a drawn game
- One point for a loss by 7 points or fewer

=== Season VI ===
The teams are divided into two zones with each zone having six teams based on their geographical proximity. Each team will play 15 intra-zonal matches and 7 inter-zonal matches.
Zone A

Team	Pld	W	L	D	SD	Pts
Gujarat Fortune Giants (R)	22	17	3	2	117	93
U Mumba	22	15	5	2	189	86
Dabang Delhi KC	22	11	9	2	-1	68
Puneri Paltan	22	8	12	2	-45	52
Jaipur Pink Panthers	22	6	13	3	-69	43
Haryana Steelers	22	6	14	2	-91	42

Zone B

Team	Pld	W	L	D	SD	Pts
Bengaluru Bulls (C)	22	13	7	2	104	78
Bengal Warriors	22	12	8	2	2	69
UP Yoddha	22	8	10	4	-45	57
Patna Pirates	22	9	11	2	-36	55
Telugu Titans	22	8	13	1	-55	51
Tamil Thalaivas	22	5	13	4	-70	42

Source: ProKabaddi

- advanced to Qualifier 1
- advanced to Eliminators
- Five points for a win
- Three points each for a drawn game
- One point for a loss by 7 points or fewer
- Top three teams from each zone qualify for the playoffs

=== Season VII ===
Team	Pld	W	L	D	SD	Pts
Dabang Delhi KC (R)	22	15	4	3	66	85
Bengal Warriors (C)	22	14	5	3	71	83
UP Yoddha	22	13	7	2	9	74
U Mumba	22	12	8	2	47	72
Haryana Steelers	22	13	8	1	15	71
Bengaluru Bulls	22	11	10	1	16	64
Jaipur Pink Panthers	22	9	11	2	-13	58
Patna Pirates	22	8	13	1	29	51
Gujarat Forunte Giants	22	7	13	2	18	51
Puneri Paltan	22	7	12	3	-72	48
Telugu Titans	22	6	13	3	-67	45
Tamil Thalaivas	22	4	15	3	-119	37

Source: ProKabaddi

- advanced to Finals
- advanced to Eliminators
- Five points for a win
- Three points each for a drawn game
- One point for a loss by 7 points or fewer
- Top 6 teams qualify for the playoffs

=== Season IX ===
Pos	Team	Pld	W	L	T	SD	Pts	
1	Jaipur Pink Panthers (C)	22	15	6	1	174	82	Qualification to semi finals
2	Puneri Paltan (R)	22	14	6	2	66	80	Qualification to semi finals
3	Bengaluru Bulls	22	13	8	1	39	74	Qualification to eliminators
4	UP Yoddha	22	12	8	2	42	71	Qualification to eliminators
5	Tamil Thalaivas	22	10	8	4	5	66	Qualification to eliminators
6	Dabang Delhi	22	10	10	2	17	63	Qualification to eliminators
7	Haryana Steelers	22	10	10	2	16	61	
8	Gujarat Giants	22	9	11	2	-16	59	
9	U Mumba	22	10	12	0	-28	56	
10	Patna Pirates	22	8	11	3	-58	54	
11	Bengal Warriors	22	8	11	3	-12	53	
12	Telugu Titans	22	2	20	0	-245	15	

Source: ProKabaddi
(C) Champion; (R) Runners Up
- 5 points for a win
- 3 points for a tied game
- 1 point for a loss by 7 points or fewer

=== Season X ===
Pos	Team	Pld	W	L	T	SD	Pts	
1	Puneri Paltan (C)	22	17	2	3	253	96	Qualification to semi finals
2	Jaipur Pink Panthers	22	16	3	3	141	92	Qualification to semi finals
3	Dabang Delhi	22	13	6	3	53	79	Qualification to eliminators
4	Gujarat Giants	22	13	9	0	32	70	Qualification to eliminators
5	Haryana Steelers (R)	22	13	8	1	-13	70	Qualification to eliminators
6	Patna Pirates	22	11	8	3	50	69	Qualification to eliminators
7	Bengal Warriors	22	9	11	2	-43	55	
8	Bengaluru Bulls	22	8	12	2	-67	53	
9	Tamil Thalaivas	22	9	13	0	32	51	
10	U Mumba	22	6	13	3	-79	45	
11	UP Yoddhas	22	4	17	1	-116	31	
12	Telugu Titans	22	2	19	1	-243	21	

Source: ProKabaddi
Rules for classification:
- 5 points for a win
- 3 points for a tied game
- 1 point for a loss by 7 points or fewer
(C) Champion; (R) Runners Up

=== Season XI ===
Pos	Team	Pld	W	L	T	SD	Pts	
1	Haryana Steelers (C)	22	16	6	0	112	84	Qualification to semi finals
2	Dabang Delhi	22	13	5	4	85	81	Qualification to semi finals
3	UP Yoddhas	22	13	6	3	97	79	Qualification to eliminators
4	Patna Pirates (R)	22	13	7	2	93	77	Qualification to eliminators
5	U Mumba	22	12	8	2	16	71	Qualification to eliminators
6	Jaipur Pink Panthers	22	12	8	2	55	70	Qualification to eliminators
7	Telugu Titans	22	12	10	0	-40	66	
8	Puneri Paltan	22	9	10	3	61	60	
9	Tamil Thalaivas	22	8	13	1	16	50	
10	Bengal Warriorz	22	5	14	3	-116	41	
11	Gujarat Giants	22	5	14	3	-152	38	
12	Bengaluru Bulls	22	2	19	1	-227	19	

Source: ProKabaddi
Rules for classification:
- 5 points for a win
- 3 points for a tied game
- 1 point for a loss by 7 points or fewer
(C) Champion; (R) Runners up

== Head coach record ==
Name	Nationality	From	To	P	W	L	D	Win%
Bhaskaran Edachery	India	2014	2017	32	23	6	3	71.88
Gholamreza Mazandarani	Iran	2018	2018	23	15	6	2	65.22
Sanjeev Kumar Baliyan	India	2019	2019	23	13	8	2	56.52
Rajaguru Subramanian	India	2020	2022	22	7	10	5	31.82
Anil Chaprana	India	2022	2023	22	10	12	0	45.45
Gholamreza Mazandarani	Iran	2023	2024	45	18	22	5	40.00
Anil Chaprana	India	2025	Present					

== Records ==
Seasons	Total	Wins	Tied	Losses	% Win	Position
Season 1	16	9	3	4	65.63%	Runners-Up
Season 2	16	14	0	2	87.50%	Champions
Season 3	16	13	0	3	81.25%	Runners-Up
Season 4	14	7	1	6	53.57%	5/8
Season 5	22	10	0	12	45.45%	7/12
Season 6	23	15	2	6	69.57%	3/12
Season 7	24	13	2	9	58.33%	4/12
Season 8	22	7	10	5	40%	10/12
Season 9	22	10	0	12	45.45%	9/12
Season 10	22	6	3	13	27.27%	10/12
Season 11	23	12	02	09	54.54%	5/12

=== By opposition ===
Note: Table lists in alphabetical order.

Opposition	Played	Won	Lost	Drawn	% Win
Bengal Warriors	22	15	5	2	68.1%
Bengaluru Bulls	23	17	6	0	73.9%
Dabang Delhi	24	13	10	1	54.1%
Gujarat Fortune Giants	17	6	10	1	35.2%
Haryana Steelers	18	7	9	2	38.8%
Jaipur Pink Panthers	25	11	11	3	44.0%
Patna Pirates	24	14	9	1	58.3%
Puneri Paltan	25	11	11	3	44.0%
Tamil Thalaivas	14	10	3	1	71.4%
Telugu Titans	21	10	8	3	47.6%
UP Yoddha	14	6	7	1	42.8%
Total	227	120	89	18	52.8%

== Sponsors ==
U Mumba announced TATA Motors will continue as their principle sponsor for Season 4, 2016. Associate sponsors are Enerzal, TVS Tyres, Adidas, Killer Jeans, Lawman pg3, Amul Macho, Prayag, Red FM 93.5, Courtyard by Marriott, Smaaash and Wockhardt Hospitals

Year	Season	Kit manufacturer	Main sponsor	Back sponsor	Sleeve sponsor
2014	I	TYKA	U Sports	Lenskart	
2015	II	TYKA	Nise Gel	Enerzal	Amul Macho
2016	III	Adidas	Tata Xenon	Amul Macho	Enerzal
2016	IV	Adidas	Tata Xenon	Amul Macho	
2017	V		Zandu Gel	Manforce	Amul Macho
2018	VI		Indigo Paints	Syska	Xiaomi
2019	VII		Indigo Paints	Haldiram's	Fingers
2021	VIII	Puma	Sansui	Macho Hint	UpGrad
2022	IX		Parimatch News	Macho Hint	Surya
2023	X	Nivia	MelBat	Macho Hint	GreatWhite
2024	XI	SIX5SIX	UpGrad	KEI	AGL Tiles
2025	XII		Roff	Valvoline	AGL Tiles
