= Patna Pirates =

Professional kabaddi team based in Patna, India

- Full name: Patna Pirates
- Nickname: The Pirates
- Sport: Kabaddi
- Founded: 2014
- First season: 2014
- Last season: 2024
- League: Pro Kabaddi League
- Based in: Patna
- Arena: Patliputra Sports Complex
- Colours
- Owner: Rajesh V Shah
- Head coach: ~~Anup Kumar~~; Randeep Dalal
- Captain: Ankit Jaglan
- League titles: 3

Patna Pirates (PTP) is a professional kabaddi team based in Patna, Bihar, that plays in the Pro Kabaddi League. The team is led by Ankit Jaglan and coached by Randeep Dalal and Prashant Kumar Rai. Their home ground is the Patliputra Sports Complex. The Pirates are the most successful team in PKL history with a record 3 titles which they won consecutively. Pirates are the only team to defend the PKL title. They have also finished as runners-up 2 times, and also hold the record for most playoff appearances in league history (9).

The Pirates won their first title by defeating defending champions U Mumba in 2016 (January), after reaching the semi-finals in the previous two seasons (2014 and 2015). In the following 2016 (June) season, Patna Pirates defeated the Jaipur Pink Panthers, thus becoming the first team in PKL history to successfully defend their title and later completed a hat-trick of titles by defeating Gujarat Fortune Giants in the final of the 2017 tournament. The 2018-19 season was a contrasting season for the usually successful Patna Pirates, as the 3-time defending champions crashed out in the group stages, thus failing to make the playoffs for the first time ever. Patna is also the first team to play 100 Pro Kabaddi matches.

== Identity ==
=== Logo and mascot ===
The Patna logo depicts a pirate with a green body and a purple beard-mustache. He is wearing a black tricorne and Eye patch. A pirate poses with angry and aggressive face.

== Franchise history ==
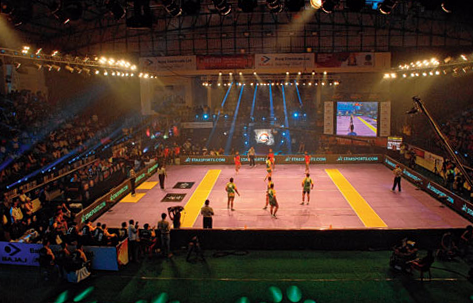
Patna Pirates during a hog match at Patliputra Sports Complex

Pro Kabaddi League (PKL) is a professional kabaddi league in India, based on the format of the Indian Premier League T20 cricket tournament. The first edition of the tournament was played in 2014 with eight franchises representing various cities in India. Patna Pirates is a Patna based franchise owned by Rajesh Shah.

== Current squad ==
Full Squad of Patna Pirates for Pro Kabaddi League Session 12,2025.

No	Name	Nat	Position
2	Ankit Jaglan (c)	(India)	All-Rounder
9	Deepak Singh (vc)	(India)	Defender - Right Cover
13	Maninder Singh	(India)	Raider
8	Ayan Lohchab	(India)	Raider
	Sahil Patil	(India)	Raider
33	Sudhakar M	(India)	Raider
	Mandeep Kumar	(India)	Raider
	Deepak Jaglan	(India)	Raider
	Ankit Rana	(India)	Raider
13	Milan Dhaiya	(India)	Raider
	Balaji Dhanabal	(India)	Defender
	Hamid Nader	(Iran)	Defender
	Saurabh Narwal	(India)	Defender
	Sombir	(India)	Defender
22	Navdeep	(India)	Defender
	Amin Ghorbani	(Iran)	Defender - Right Corner
	Ashish Birwal	(India)	Defender - Left Corner
	Sanket Sawant	(India)	Defender - Left Cover
	Jadhav Shahaji	(India)	Defender - Right Cover
Source: Pro Kabaddi

== Seasons ==
=== Season I ===
Patna Pirates got the 3rd spot in the first season. They were led by Manpreet Singh (currently coach of Haryana Steelers).

Team	Pld	W	L	D	SD	Pts
Jaipur Pink Panthers (C)	14	10	3	1	100	54
U Mumba (R)	14	8	3	3	59	51
Bengaluru Bulls (4)	14	8	5	1	36	47
Patna Pirates (3)	14	7	5	2	18	45
Telugu Titans	14	6	5	3	26	42
Dabang Delhi KC	14	5	8	1	-27	32
Bengal Warriors	14	4	9	1	-85	24
Puneri Paltan	14	2	12	0	-127	17

Source: ProKabaddi

(C) Champion; (R) Runners-up; (3) Third Place; (4) Fourth Place.

- Advanced to the Playoff Stage
- Five points for a win
- Three points each for a drawn game
- One point for a loss by 7 points or fewer
- Top 4 teams qualified for the semifinals

=== Season II ===
Patna Pirates got the 4th spot in the second season.

Team	Pld	W	L	D	SD	Pts
U Mumba (C)	14	12	2	0	40	60
Telugu Titans (3)	14	8	3	3	85	50
Bengaluru Bulls (R)	14	9	5	0	55	48
Patna Pirates (4)	14	7	6	1	-18	41
Jaipur Pink Panthers	14	6	7	1	43	38
Bengal Warriors	14	4	9	1	-63	27
Dabang Delhi KC	14	4	9	1	-68	27
Puneri Paltan	14	2	11	1	-74	21

Source: ProKabaddi
(C) Champion; (R) Runners-up; (3) Third Place; (4) Fourth Place.

- Advanced to the Playoff Stage
- Five points for a win
- Three points each for a drawn game
- One point for a loss by 7 points or fewer

=== Season III ===
This season Patna Pirates finished the league as champions defeating U Mumba in a nail-biting match by 3 close points.

Team	Pld	W	L	D	SD	Pts
U Mumba (R)	14	12	2	0	95	60
Patna Pirates (C)	14	10	2	2	104	58
Puneri Paltan (3)	14	7	4	3	92	48
Bengal Warriors (4)	14	9	5	0	26	47
Telugu Titans	14	7	7	0	-10	38
Jaipur Pink Panthers	14	4	8	2	-63	28
Bengaluru Bulls	14	2	12	0	-102	14
Dabang Delhi KC	14	1	12	1	-142	11

Source: ProKabaddi

(C) Champion; (R) Runners-up; (3) Third Place; (4) Fourth Place.

- Advanced to the Playoff Stage
- Five points for a win
- Three points each for a drawn game
- One point for a loss by 7 points or fewer

=== Season IV ===
This season Patna Pirates successfully defended their title in the presence of Dubki King Pardeep Narwal and became 2-time champions of PKL.

Team	Pld	W	L	D	SD	Pts
Patna Pirates (C)	14	10	4	0	14	52
Telugu Titans	14	8	4	2	67	50
Jaipur Pink Panthers (R)	14	8	5	1	22	47
Puneri Paltan	14	6	6	2	23	42
U Mumba	14	7	6	1	-18	42
Bengaluru Bulls	14	5	8	1	-55	32
Dabang Delhi KC	14	4	9	1	7	29
Bengal Warriors	14	3	9	2	-60	26

Source:www.prokabaddi.com

- Advanced to the Playoff Stage
- Five points for a win
- Three points each for a drawn game
- One point for a loss by 7 points or fewer

=== Season V ===
This season Patna Pirates retained Pardeep Narwal before the auction. Pardeep Narwal has also scored fastest 50 raid points in the history of Pro Kabaddi League in just 4 matches. He also became the first player to score 100 points with an average of 12.77 in 9 matches. Now he is the Top Raider of Pro Kabaddi Season 5 with 369 raid points. In his playoff with Haryana, Pardeep broke 4 records in one day:- 1. 34 raid points in a single match. 2. Team making most overall points in just one match - 69. 3. Triple century in one season. 4. 8 raid points in a single raid.

Patna Pirates beat Gujarat Fortune Giants to become champions for the third time. Patna Pirates is the only team to win 3 titles in a row.

The teams are divided into two zones with each zone having six teams based on their geographical proximity. Each team will play 15 intra-zonal matches and 7 inter-zonal matches.
Zone A

Team	Pld	W	L	D	SD	Pts
Gujarat Fortune Giants (R)	22	15	4	3	126	87
Puneri Paltan	22	15	7	0	91	80
Haryana Steelers	22	13	5	4	40	79
U Mumba	22	10	12	0	-50	56
Jaipur Pink Panthers	22	8	13	1	-91	51
Dabang Delhi KC	22	5	16	1	-134	29

Zone B

Team	Pld	W	L	D	SD	Pts
Bengal Warriors	22	11	5	6	19	77
Patna Pirates (C)	22	10	7	5	60	71
UP Yoddha	22	8	10	4	2	60
Bengaluru Bulls	22	8	11	3	10	57
Telugu Titans	22	7	12	3	-2	52
Tamil Thalaivas	22	6	14	2	-71	46

Source: ProKabaddi

- advanced to Qualifier 1
- advanced to Eliminators
- Five points for a win
- Three points each for a drawn game
- One point for a loss by 7 points or fewer

=== Season VI ===
Patna pirates have retained Pardeep Narwal, Vijay, Jawahar Dagar and Manish. The teams are divided into two zones with each zone having six teams based on their geographical proximity. Each team will play 15 intra-zonal matches and 7 inter-zonal matches.
Zone A

Team	Pld	W	L	D	SD	Pts
Gujarat Fortune Giants (R)	22	17	3	2	117	93
U Mumba	22	15	5	2	189	86
Dabang Delhi KC	22	11	9	2	-1	68
Puneri Paltan	22	8	12	2	-45	52
Jaipur Pink Panthers	22	6	13	3	-69	43
Haryana Steelers	22	6	14	2	-91	42

Zone B

Team	Pld	W	L	D	SD	Pts
Bengaluru Bulls (C)	22	13	7	2	104	78
Bengal Warriors	22	12	8	2	2	69
UP Yoddha	22	8	10	4	-45	57
Patna Pirates	22	9	11	2	-36	55
Telugu Titans	22	8	13	1	-55	51
Tamil Thalaivas	22	5	13	4	-70	42

Source: ProKabaddi

- advanced to Qualifier 1
- advanced to Eliminators
- Five points for a win
- Three points each for a drawn game
- One point for a loss by 7 points or fewer
- Top three teams from each zone qualify for the playoffs

=== Season VII ===
This season they have retained Pardeep Narwal again, but released Manish and retained Vikash Jaglan instead

Team	Pld	W	L	D	SD	Pts
Dabang Delhi KC (R)	22	15	4	3	66	85
Bengal Warriors (C)	22	14	5	3	71	83
UP Yoddha	22	13	7	2	9	74
U Mumba	22	12	8	2	47	72
Haryana Steelers	22	13	8	1	15	71
Bengaluru Bulls	22	11	10	1	16	64
Jaipur Pink Panthers	22	9	11	2	-13	58
Patna Pirates	22	8	13	1	29	51
Gujarat Forunte Giants	22	7	13	2	18	51
Puneri Paltan	22	7	12	3	-72	48
Telugu Titans	22	6	13	3	-67	45
Tamil Thalaivas	22	4	15	3	-119	37

Source: ProKabaddi

- advanced to Finals
- advanced to Eliminators
- Five points for a win
- Three points each for a drawn game
- One point for a loss by 7 points or fewer
- Top 6 teams qualify for the playoffs

=== Season VIII ===
Pos	Team	Pld	W	L	T	SD	Pts	
1	Patna Pirates (R)	22	16	5	1	120	86	Qualification to semi finals
2	Dabang Delhi (C)	22	12	6	4	-3	75	Qualification to semi finals
3	UP Yoddha	22	10	9	3	33	68	Qualification to eliminators
4	Gujarat Giants	22	10	8	4	2	67	Qualification to eliminators
5	Bengaluru Bulls	22	11	9	2	53	66	Qualification to eliminators
6	Puneri Paltan	22	12	9	1	33	66	Qualification to eliminators
7	Haryana Steelers	22	10	9	3	-28	64	
8	Jaipur Pink Panthers	22	10	10	2	14	63	
9	Bengal Warriors	22	9	10	3	-18	57	
10	U Mumba	22	7	10	5	-34	55	
11	Tamil Thalaivas	22	5	11	6	-42	47	
12	Telugu Titans	22	1	17	4	-130	27	

Updated to match(es) played on 25 February 2022. Source: ProKabaddi
(C) Champion; (R) Runners Up
- Five points for a win
- Three points each for a drawn game
- One point for a loss by 7 points or fewer

=== Season IX ===
Pos	Team	Pld	W	L	T	SD	Pts	
1	Jaipur Pink Panthers (C)	22	15	6	1	174	82	Qualification to semi finals
2	Puneri Paltan (R)	22	14	6	2	66	80	Qualification to semi finals
3	Bengaluru Bulls	22	13	8	1	39	74	Qualification to eliminators
4	UP Yoddha	22	12	8	2	42	71	Qualification to eliminators
5	Tamil Thalaivas	22	10	8	4	5	66	Qualification to eliminators
6	Dabang Delhi	22	10	10	2	17	63	Qualification to eliminators
7	Haryana Steelers	22	10	10	2	16	61	
8	Gujarat Giants	22	9	11	2	-16	59	
9	U Mumba	22	10	12	0	-28	56	
10	Patna Pirates	22	8	11	3	-58	54	
11	Bengal Warriors	22	8	11	3	-12	53	
12	Telugu Titans	22	2	20	0	-245	15	

Source: ProKabaddi
(C) Champion; (R) Runners Up
- 5 points for a win
- 3 points for a tied game
- 1 point for a loss by 7 points or fewer

=== Season X ===
Pos	Team	Pld	W	L	T	SD	Pts	
1	Puneri Paltan (C)	22	17	2	3	253	96	Qualification to semi finals
2	Jaipur Pink Panthers	22	16	3	3	141	92	Qualification to semi finals
3	Dabang Delhi	22	13	6	3	53	79	Qualification to eliminators
4	Gujarat Giants	22	13	9	0	32	70	Qualification to eliminators
5	Haryana Steelers (R)	22	13	8	1	-13	70	Qualification to eliminators
6	Patna Pirates	22	11	8	3	50	69	Qualification to eliminators
7	Bengal Warriors	22	9	11	2	-43	55	
8	Bengaluru Bulls	22	8	12	2	-67	53	
9	Tamil Thalaivas	22	9	13	0	32	51	
10	U Mumba	22	6	13	3	-79	45	
11	UP Yoddhas	22	4	17	1	-116	31	
12	Telugu Titans	22	2	19	1	-243	21	

Source: ProKabaddi
Rules for classification:
- 5 points for a win
- 3 points for a tied game
- 1 point for a loss by 7 points or fewer
(C) Champion; (R) Runners Up

== Records for Patna Pirates ==
Seasons	Total	Wins	Losses	Tied	% Win	Position
Season 1	16	8	6	2	56.25%	3rd place
Season 2	16	7	8	1	46.88%	4th place
Season 3	16	12	2	2	81.25%	Champions
Season 4	16	12	4	0	75%	Champions
Season 5	26	14	7	5	63.46%	Champions
Season 6	22	9	11	4	50%	Group stage
Season 7	22	8	13	1	38.64%	Group stage
Season 8	24	17	6	1	72.92 %	Runners-up
Season 9	22	8	11	3	36.36%	Group stage
Season 10	24	12	9	3	50%	Semifinals
Season 11	25	15	8	2	60%	Runners-up
Season 12	22	11	11	0	50%	Eliminator 3 (Technically 4th)

=== By opposition (for Patna Pirates) ===
Note: Table lists in alphabetical order.

Opposition	Played	Won	Lost	Drawn	% Win
Bengal Warriors	25	16	6	3	64.0%
Bengaluru Bulls	26	14	8	4	53.8%
Dabang Delhi	23	11	9	3	47.8%
Gujarat Fortune Giants	15	8	6	1	53.3%
Haryana Steelers	15	5	9	1	33.3%
Jaipur Pink Panthers	23	13	10	0	56.5%
Puneri Paltan	25	15	6	4	60.0%
Tamil Thalaivas	16	9	4	3	56.2%
Telugu Titans	25	13	11	1	52.0%
U Mumba	24	9	14	1	37.5%
UP Yoddha	18	10	7	1	55.5%
Total	235	123	90	22	52.3%

== Sponsors ==
Year	Season	Kit manufacturer	Main sponsor	Back sponsor	Sleeve sponsor
2014	I	Bee Sports	Bajaj Electricals	Navratna Tail	Mukand
2015	II	Bee Sports	Volini	Navratna Tail	Mukand
2016	III	Bee Sports	Revital-H	Mukand	SunEdison
2016	IV	Bee Sports	Manforce	Himalaya Men	TT Innerwear
2017	V	Bee Sports	Birla Gold Cement	Johnson Tiles	Supreme
2018	VI	4U Sports	Birla Gold Cement	Capital Float	Supreme
2019	VII	Pace International	Birla Gold Cement	Revital-H	Mukand
2021	VIII	Pace International	DafaNews	WinZO	Rage Fan
2022	IX	Pace International	1xBat	Vision11	
2023	X	Pace International	Blissful Bihar	Dr. Ortho	Servokon
2024	XI	Pace International	DafaNews	Dr. Ortho	Lubi Pumps
2025	XII	Vats	PNB	Nimulid Strong	Portronics
