= Baskaran =

Baskaran is a given name and a surname. Notable people with the name include:

Surname:

- Adhiban Baskaran (born 1992), Indian chess Grandmaster
- Aparna Baskaran, Indian and American physicist
- Commando A Baskaran, Chairman of Tiruvallur town
- Ganapathy Baskaran, Indian theoretical physicist
- Kasinatha Baskaran (born 1968), professional Indian Kabaddi sportsman
- S. Theodore Baskaran (born 1940), Indian film historian and wildlife conservationist
- Sathasivam Baskaran, Sri Lankan Tamil distributor for the Tamil newspaper Uthayan
- Vasudevan Baskaran (born 1950), Indian field hockey player'
- Vigneshwaran Baskaran (born 1990), Indian professional footballer
- Vinoth Baskaran (born 1990), Singaporean cricketer

Given name:

- Baskaran Kandiah, Sri Lankan businessman, co-founder and Director of Lebara Group
- Baskaran Pillai, authority of the Tamil Siddha tradition
- Baskaran Ranjit (born 1991), Indian cricketer

== See also ==
- 25653 Baskaran, minor planet, 3.5 km diameter, discovered 5 January 2000
- Mallakam Sri Baskaran Cricket Ground, in Mallakam, Jaffna District, Sri Lanka
- Balasekaran
- Baska (disambiguation)
- Boškarin
