= 2017 Tamil Thalaivas season =

- Sport: Kabaddi
- League: PKL
- Location: Chennai, Tamil Nadu, India
- Stadium: Jawaharlal Nehru Stadium (Capacity: 8,000)
- Owner: Nimmagadda Prasad; Sachin Tendulkar; Allu Arjun; Ram Charan; Allu Aravind
- Head coach: (India) K Baskaran
- Captain: (India) Ajay Thakur

The 2017 Tamil Thalaivas season is the first season of the Tamil Thalaivas' existence in the Pro Kabaddi League. The team is led by Ajay Thakur and coached by K Baskaran. The team is owned by Nimmagadda Prasad and former Indian cricket captain Sachin Tendulkar, Actors Allu Arjun and Ram Charan and also Allu Aravind. Actor Kamal Hasan is the brand ambassador of the team. Tamil Thalaivas play their home matches at the Jawaharlal Nehru Stadium (Chennai), Tamil Nadu.

== Review ==
The Thalaivas added defender Amit Hooda, who was paid Rs 63 lakh, along with C Arun and Sanket Chavan to bolster the defence. They also signed raider, Ajay Thakur, who led the team onto the pitch as captain. M Thivakaran and Sombir were other names in attack.

== Current squad ==
No.	Name	Nationality	Birth date	Role	Previous Team
7	Ajay Thakur (C)	(India)	1 May 1986 (age 40)	Raider	Puneri Paltan
NA	Ananth Kumar	(India)	25 October 1995 (age 30)	All-Rounder	NEW
88	Prathap D	(India)	29 January 1996 (age 30)	All-Rounder	NEW
NA	Sujit Maharana	(India)	5 June 1999 (age 27)	All-Rounder	NEW
NA	Chansik Park	(South Korea)	30 August 1996 (age 30)	All-Rounder	NEW
6	Bhavani Rajput	(India)	14 May 1995 (age 31)	Raider	NEW
1	Dong Geon Lee	(South Korea)	1 July 1996 (age 30)	Raider	NEW
11	K. Prapanjan	(India)	29 May 1993 (age 33)	Raider	U Mumba
NA	M. Thivakaran	(India)	9 November 1989 (age 36)	Raider	NEW
NA	Sarang Arun Deshmukh	(India)	2 January 1998 (age 28)	Raider	NEW
NA	Sombir	(India)	18 March 1996 (age 30)	Raider	NA
3	Vineet Sharma	(India)	10 January 1990 (age 36)	Raider	NA
NA	Waleed Al Hasani	(Oman)	15 July 1985 (age 41)	Raider	Puneri Paltan
28	Darshan J Devang	(India)	28 June 1997 (age 29)	Defender (Right Cover)	NEW
12	Maruthu M	(India)	10 January 1996 (age 30)	Defender (Right Cover)	NEW
NA	Vijin Thangadurai	(India)	20 May 1990 (age 36)	Defender (Right Cover)	Bengal Warriors
10	Amit Hooda	(India)	3 May 1996 (age 30)	Defender (Right Corner)	Jaipur Pink Panthers
NA	Mugilan Batumalai	(Malaysia)	28 May 1993 (age 33)	Defender (Right Corner)	NEW
NA	Prabhakaran T	(India)	20 February 1989 (age 37)	Defender (Right Corner)	NEW
NA	Anil Kumar	(India)	1 June 1991 (age 35)	Defender (Left Cover)	NA
NA	C. Arun	(India)	5 March 1993 (age 33)	Defender (Left Cover)	Jaipur Pink Panthers
NA	Rajesh Manokaran	(India)	10 March 1995 (age 31)	Defender (Left Cover)	NEW
NA	Anil Kumar	(India)	15 June 1991 (age 35)	Defender (Left Corner)	Dabang Delhi
63	Sanket Chavan	(India)	24 August 1994 (age 32)	Defender (Left Corner)	NA
NA	Vijay Kumar	(India)	NA	Defender (Left Corner)	NEW

== Points table ==
The teams are divided into two zones with each zone having six teams based on their geographical proximity. Each team will play 15 intra-zonal matches and 7 inter-zonal matches.
Zone A

Team	Pld	W	L	D	SD	Pts
Gujarat Fortune Giants (R)	22	15	4	3	126	87
Puneri Paltan	22	15	7	0	91	80
Haryana Steelers	22	13	5	4	40	79
U Mumba	22	10	12	0	-50	56
Jaipur Pink Panthers	22	8	13	1	-91	51
Dabang Delhi KC	22	5	16	1	-134	29

Zone B

Team	Pld	W	L	D	SD	Pts
Bengal Warriors	22	11	5	6	19	77
Patna Pirates (C)	22	10	7	5	60	71
UP Yoddha	22	8	10	4	2	60
Bengaluru Bulls	22	8	11	3	10	57
Telugu Titans	22	7	12	3	-2	52
Tamil Thalaivas	22	6	14	2	-71	46

Source: ProKabaddi

- advanced to Qualifier 1
- advanced to Eliminators
- Five points for a win
- Three points each for a drawn game
- One point for a loss by 7 points or fewer

== Sponsors ==
Tamil Thalaivas announced Muthoot Fincorp India will be the title sponsor. Associate sponsors included Maha Cements, Agni Steels, Nippon Paints, Smartron, and the kit was sponsored by Admiral Sportswear

Season	Kit Manufacturer	Shirt Sponsor
2017	Admiral Sportswear	Muthoot
