= Baška =

Baška may refer to places:

- Baška, Croatia, a municipality in Croatia
- Baška (Frýdek-Místek District), a municipality in the Czech Republic
- Baška, Košice-okolie District, a municipality in Slovakia

== See also ==
- Baska (disambiguation)
