= Pawan Sehrawat =

Indian Kabaddi Player

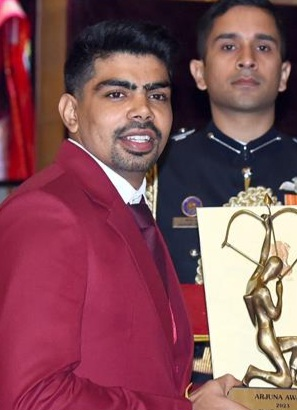
- Pawan during receiving Arjuna Award in 2024

Personal information
- Full name: Pawan Kumar Sehrawat
- Nickname: Hi-Flyer
- Nationality: Indian
- Born: 9 July 1996 (age 30) New Delhi, India
- Education: Delhi University
- Years active: 2016–present
- Height: 178 cm (5 ft 10 in)
- Weight: 82 kg (181 lb)

Sport
- Country: India
- Sport: Kabaddi
- Position: Raider
- League: Pro Kabaddi League
- Team: Bengaluru Bulls (2016, 2018–2021); Gujarat Giants (2017); Tamil Thalaivas (2022, 2025–present); Telugu Titans (2023–2024)
Medal record
Men's kabaddi
Representing India
Asian Games
Gold medal – first place	2026 Aichi–Nagoya	Team
Gold medal – first place	2022 Hangzhou	Team
Asian Championship
Gold medal – first place	2023 Busan	Team
South Asian Games
Gold medal – first place	2019 Kathmandu	Team

Pawan Sehrawat (born 9 July 1996) is an Indian kabaddi player. He plays for Telugu Titans in the Pro Kabaddi League. He was the most expensive player in the history of the league when Tamil Thalaivas picked him for ₹ 2.26 crores for the ninth season. He was bought by the Telugu Titans for Rs 2.60 crore for the tenth season, again becoming the most expensive player of the league.

== Early life ==
Pawan Sehrawat was born in Delhi on 9 July 1996. He is 30 years old. His father's name is Rajbeer Singh Sehrawat. He completed his secondary education at the government school in Bawana. He was employed at RBI.

== Career ==
=== Pro-Kabaddi league ===
Initial seasons

Pawan made his debut for Bengaluru Bulls in third season of Pro Kabaddi League. He played in 13 games and finished as his team's leading raid-point scorer with 45 points. Pawan played ten games in season 4 and scored only 11 points from 33 raids. Pawan was picked up by Gujarat Giants for season 5 and was mainly used as an impact raider off the bench. He played nine matches including the final and scored ten points.

Break through and key player

Pawan returned to Bengaluru Bulls for season 6. He scored 20 raid points in the first match against Tamil Thalaivas. He scored four Super 10s in his first five appearances. He eventually finished with 282 points with 13 Super 10s . Pawan scored 13 raid points in Qualifier 1 and 22 raid points in the final against Gujarat Giants with Bengaluru Bulls winning their maiden title. He was crowned the league's Most Valuable Player.

Sehrawat led the Bulls to their second playoff appearance in season 7 and finished the season as the league's top scorer with 353 points. He scored 39 raid points against Haryana Steelers, the most by any raider in a single game in the history of Pro Kabaddi League. Pawan was the most successful raider scoring 320 points in season 8.

Injury and comeback

Pawan became the most expensive player in the history of the Pro Kabaddi League when Tamil Thalaivas picked him for ₹ 2.26 crores for the ninth season. However, he suffered a knee injury in the first match of the season against Gujarat Giants, ending his season.

Before the tenth season, Pawan was released by Tamil Thalaivas and went into the auction pool. Pawan was bagged by Telugu Titans for a record-breaking deal of ₹2.6 crores in the auction. Pawan Sehrawat has played 5 matches so far in Pro Kabaddi League Season 10, in which he has scored a total of 53 points and is the third most successful raider in the league.

=== International career ===
Pawan played for the India national kabaddi team at the 2019 South Asian Games winning the gold medal. He won gold medal at the Asian Kabaddi Championship 2023 representing the Indian team.

== Career Statistics ==
Updated as of 5 September 2026

Team	Season	League	Apps	Raid Points	Super 10s	Tackle Points	High 5s	Total Points
Bengaluru Bulls	2016 (Jan)	Pro Kabaddi League	13	45	0	8	0	53
Bengaluru Bulls	2016 (Jun)	Pro Kabaddi League	10	11	0	0	0	11
Bengaluru Bulls	Total		23	56	0	8	0	64
Gujrat Giants	2017	Pro Kabaddi League	9	9	0	1	0	10
Bengaluru Bulls	2018–19	Pro Kabaddi League	24	271	13	11	0	282
Bengaluru Bulls	2019	Pro Kabaddi League	24	346	18	14	0	360
Bengaluru Bulls	2021–22	Pro Kabaddi League	24	304	18	16	1	320
Bengaluru Bulls	Total		72	921	49	41	1	962
Tamil Thalaivas	2022	Pro Kabaddi League	1	1	0	0	0	1
Telugu Titans	2023–24	Pro Kabaddi League	21	202	13	15	1	217
Telugu Titans	2024	Pro Kabaddi League	13	129	8	5	0	134
Telugu Titans	Total		34	331	21	20	1	351
Tamil Thalaivas	2025	Pro Kabaddi League	3	22	0	0	0	22
Career total			142	1340	70	70	2	1410

== Achievements ==
- Most Valuable Player, 2018 Pro Kabaddi league
- Most raid points, 2018, 2019 and 2021–22 Pro Kabaddi League
- Most raid points in a Pro Kabaddi match (39)
- Gold, 2019 South Asian Games
- Gold, Asian Kabaddi Championship 2023

== Awards ==
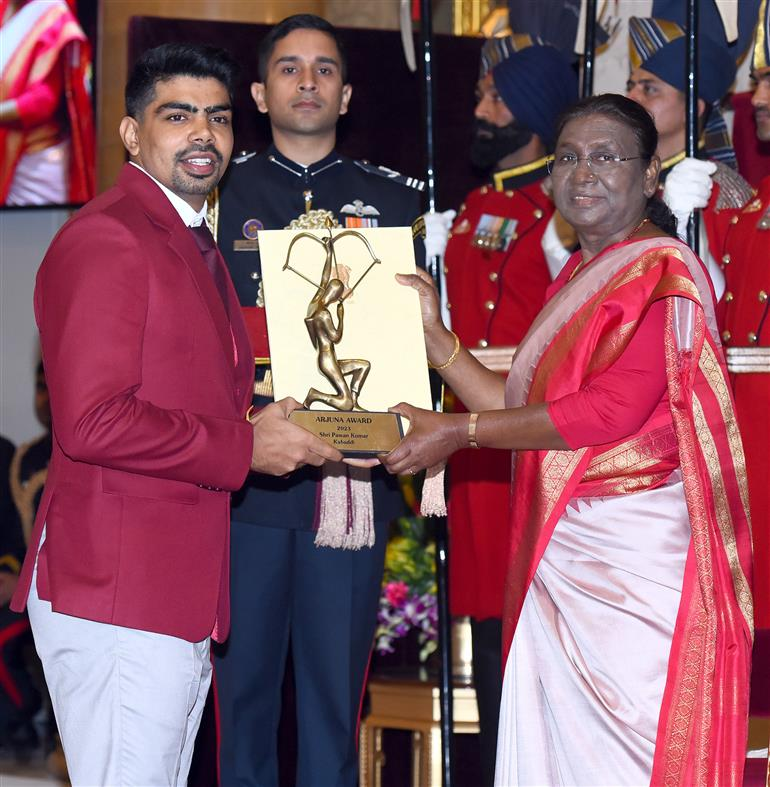
Pawan Sherawat receiving Arjuna Award from President Droupadi Murmu on 9th January 2024

He was conferred the Arjuna Award for 2023.
