= Ankush =

Ankush may refer to:

- Ankusha, term for the elephant goad in India
- Ankush (1986 film), an Indian Hindi-language action drama film
- Ankush (2023 film), an Indian Marathi-language action drama film
- Ankush (given name), an Indian male given name
- Ankush (kabaddi), an Indian kabaddi player

== See also ==
- Ankushapur (disambiguation)
