= Ankushapur =

Ankushapur may refer to:

- Ankushapur, Warangal a village in Andhra Pradesh, India
- Ankushapur, Ranga Reddy a village in Andhra Pradesh, India

== See also ==
- Ankush (disambiguation)
