= 2022 Pro Kabaddi League =

9th Season of Pro Kabaddi League

Vivo Pro Kabaddi 2022 Season 9
- Le panga

Tournament information
- Dates: 7 October 2022–17 December 2022
- Administrator: Mashal Sports
- Tournament format(s): Double round robin and playoffs
- Host: India
- Teams: 12
- Website: prokabaddi.com

Final positions
- Champion: Jaipur Pink Panthers (2nd title)
- Runner-up: Puneri Paltan

Tournament statistics
- Matches played: 137
- Top scorer: (India) Arjun Deshwal (296) (Jaipur Pink Panthers)
- Most tackle points: (India) Ankush (89) (Jaipur Pink Panthers)
- Most successful raid: (India) Arjun Deshwal (237) (Jaipur Pink Panthers)
- Most successful tackle: (India) Ankush (Jaipur Pink Panthers) (84)

The 2022 Vivo Pro Kabaddi League was the ninth season of Pro Kabaddi League. The season began on 7 October 2022 and ended on 17 December 2022. Jaipur Pink Panthers defeated Puneri Paltan in the final match to win their second title.

The player auction for season 9 was conducted on 5 August 2022 in Mumbai. The fixtures of the tournament were announced on 21 September 2022 and 11 October 2022 for the remaining tournament. Each team played against all the other teams twice, and the top 6 teams proceeded to the playoffs. The tournament was played across Bengaluru, Pune and Hyderabad, while the playoffs were played in Mumbai.

== Teams ==
Locations of the Pro Kabaddi teams

=== Personnel and sponsorships ===
Note: Table lists in alphabetical order.

Teams	Owners	Captain	Head coach	Kit Manufacturer	Main Kit Sponsor
Bengal Warriors	Kishore Biyani	(India) Maninder Singh	(India) Kasinatha Baskaran	Omtex	DafaNews
Bengaluru Bulls	Badri Narayan Choudhary Kota; Ananda Giri	(India) Mahender Singh	(India) Randhir Singh Sehrawat	Vats	VST Tillers
Dabang Delhi	Radha Kapoor	(India) Naveen Kumar	(India) Krishan Kumar Hooda	Shiv-Naresh	JK Super Cement
Gujarat Giants	Gautam Adani	(India) Chandran Ranjith	(India) Ram Mehar Singh	Shiv-Naresh	1xBat
Haryana Steelers	Parth Jindal	(India) Joginder Narwal	(India) Manpreet Singh	Shiv-Naresh	JSW
Jaipur Pink Panthers	Abhishek Bachchan	(India) Sunil Kumar	(India) Sanjeev Kumar Baliyan	TYKA	Fairplay Fantasy
Patna Pirates	Rajesh V. Shah	(India) Neeraj Kumar	(India) Ravi Shetty	Pace International	1xBat
Puneri Paltan	Rajesh Harkishandas Doshi; Sumanlal Babulal Shah; Nallepilly Ramaswami Subramanian	(Iran) Fazel Atrachali	(India) BC Ramesh	Shiv-Naresh	Force Motors
Tamil Thalaivas	Nimmagadda Prasad; Sachin Tendulkar; Allu Arjun; Ram Charan; Ritik Chauhan	(India) Sagar	(India) Ashan Kumar	Trak-Only	DafaNews
Telugu Titans	Srinivas Sreeramaneni; Goutham Reddy Nedurmalli; Mahesh Kolli	(India) Surjeet Singh Narwal	(India) Venkatesh Goud	Omtex	DafaNews
U Mumba	Ronnie Screwvala	(India) Surinder Singh	(India) Anil Chaprana		Parimatch News
UP Yoddha	Kiran Kumar Grandhi	(India) Pardeep Narwal	(India) Jasveer Singh	Shiv-Naresh	Fanstasy Akhada

=== Foreign players ===
Each team can sign a maximum of 3 foreign players to the squad.

Teams	Player 1	POS	Player 2	POS	Player 3	POS
Bengal Warriors	(Sri Lanka) Aslam Thambi	Raider	(Iran) Soleiman Pahlevani	Defender		
Bengaluru Bulls	(Nepal) Lal Mohar Yadav	Raider	(Nepal) Nageshor Tharu	Raider		
Dabang Delhi	(Bangladesh) Md. Liton Ali	Defender - Right Corner	(Iran) Reza Katoulinezhad	All-Rounder		
Gujarat Giants	(South Korea) Dong Geon Lee	Raider	(South Korea) Young Chang Ko	Defender - Right Cover		
Haryana Steelers	(Iran) Mohammad Mahalli	Raider	(Iran) Amirhossein Bastami	Defender		
Jaipur Pink Panthers	(South Korea) Woosan KO	Defender - Left Cover	(Iran) Reza Mirbagheri	Defender		
Patna Pirates	(Iran) Mohammadreza Chiyaneh	All-Rounder	(Kenya) Daniel Odhiambo	All-Rounder		
Puneri Paltan	(Iran) Fazel Atrachali	Defender	(Iran) Mohammad Esmaeil Nabibakhsh	All-Rounder		
Tamil Thalaivas	(Bangladesh) Md. Arif Rabbani	Defender - Left Corner	(Sri Lanka) Thanushan Laxmamohan	All-Rounder		
Telugu Titans	(Iran) Mohsen Maghsoudlou	All-Rounder	(Iran) Hamid Nader	All-Rounder		
U Mumba	(Iran) Heidarali Ekrami	Raider	(Iran) Gholamabbas Korouki	All-Rounder		
UP Yoddha	(Iran) Abozar Mohajermighani	Defender	(Kenya) James Kamweti	Raider		

== Sponsorship ==
Title Sponsor

- Vivo

Associate Sponsors

- Tata Motors
- Dream11
- MFine
- A23
- BYJU'S
- Mutual Funds

Partners

- Parimatch News
- Officer's Choice
- Dhani
- UltraTech Cement

Broadcast Sponsor

- Star Sports

Digital Streaming Partner

- Disney+ Hotstar

== Points table ==
Pos	Team	Pld	W	L	T	SD	Pts	
1	Jaipur Pink Panthers (C)	22	15	6	1	174	82	Qualification to semi finals
2	Puneri Paltan (R)	22	14	6	2	66	80	Qualification to semi finals
3	Bengaluru Bulls	22	13	8	1	39	74	Qualification to eliminators
4	UP Yoddha	22	12	8	2	42	71	Qualification to eliminators
5	Tamil Thalaivas	22	10	8	4	5	66	Qualification to eliminators
6	Dabang Delhi	22	10	10	2	17	63	Qualification to eliminators
7	Haryana Steelers	22	10	10	2	16	61	
8	Gujarat Giants	22	9	11	2	-16	59	
9	U Mumba	22	10	12	0	-28	56	
10	Patna Pirates	22	8	11	3	-58	54	
11	Bengal Warriors	22	8	11	3	-12	53	
12	Telugu Titans	22	2	20	0	-245	15	

Source: ProKabaddi
(C) Champion; (R) Runners Up
- 5 points for a win
- 3 points for a tied game
- 1 point for a loss by 7 points or fewer

== League Stage ==
=== Leg 1 – Kanteerava Indoor Stadium, Bangalore ===
Match 1
7 October 2022
19:30 (IST)

Dabang Delhi	41 – 27	U Mumba
Naveen Kumar (13)	Report	Ashish Narwal (7)

Dabang Delhi won

Match 2
7 October 2022
20:30 (IST)

Bengaluru Bulls	34 – 29	Telugu Titans
Bharat (5)	Report	Rajnish (7)

Bengaluru Bulls won

Match 3
7 October 2022
21:30 (IST)

Jaipur Pink Panthers	32 – 34	UP Yoddha
Arjun Deshwal (8)	Report	Surender Gill (8)

UP Yoddha won

Match 4
8 October 2022
19:30 (IST)

Patna Pirates	34 – 34	Puneri Paltan
Sachin Tanwar (8)	Report	Mohit Goyat (7)

Match drawn

Match 5
8 October 2022
20:30 (IST)

Gujarat Giants	31 – 31	Tamil Thalaivas
H.S. Rakesh (13)	Report	Narender (10)

Match drawn

Match 6
8 October 2022
21:30 (IST)

Bengal Warriors	33 – 41	Haryana Steelers
Manoj Gowda (8)	Report	Manjeet (18)

Haryana Steelers won

Match 7
9 October 2022
19:30 (IST)

Jaipur Pink Panthers	35 – 30	Patna Pirates
Arjun Deshwal (17)	Report	Rohit Gulia (11)

Jaipur Pink Panthers won

Match 8
9 October 2022
20:30 (IST)

Telugu Titans	25 – 45	Bengal Warriors
Monu Goyat (7)	Report	Maninder Singh (11)

Bengal Warriors won

Match 9
9 October 2022
21:30 (IST)

Puneri Paltan	39 – 41	Bengaluru Bulls
Aslam Inamdar (12)	Report	Bharat (12)

Bengaluru Bulls won

Match 10
10 October 2022
19:30 (IST)

U Mumba	30 – 23	UP Yoddha
Jai Bhagwan (5)	Report	Pardeep Narwal (5)

U Mumba won

Match 11
10 October 2022
20:30 (IST)

Dabang Delhi	53 – 33	Gujarat Giants
Naveen Kumar (15)	Report	H.S. Rakesh (14)

Dabang Delhi won

Match 12
11 October 2022
19:30 (IST)

Haryana Steelers	27 – 22	Tamil Thalaivas
Manjeet (6)	Report	Narender (3)

Haryana Steelers won

Match 13
11 October 2022
20:30 (IST)

Patna Pirates	21 – 30	Telugu Titans
Sachin Tanwar (6)	Report	Monu Goyat (9)

Telugu Titans won

Match 14
12 October 2022
19:30 (IST)

Bengaluru Bulls	33 – 42	Bengal Warriors
Bharat (8)	Report	Maninder Singh (11)

Bengal Warriors won

Match 15
12 October 2022
20:30 (IST)

UP Yoddha	42 – 44	Dabang Delhi
Surender Gill (21)	Report	Naveen Kumar (13)

Dabang Delhi won

Match 16
14 October 2022
19:30 (IST)

Tamil Thalaivas	32 – 39	U Mumba
Narender (15)	Report	Guman Singh (12)

U Mumba won

Match 17
14 October 2022
20:30 (IST)

Haryana Steelers	31 – 44	Jaipur Pink Panthers
Meetu Sharma (14)	Report	Arjun Deshwal (14)

Jaipur Pink Panthers won

Match 18
14 October 2022
21:30 (IST)

Gujarat Giants	47 – 37	Puneri Paltan
H.S. Rakesh (15)	Report	Aslam Inamdar (19)

Gujarat Giants won

Match 19
15 October 2022
19:30 (IST)

Jaipur Pink Panthers	25 – 18	Gujarat Giants
Bhavani Rajput (5)	Report	Parteek Dhaiya (6)

Jaipur Pink Panthers won

Match 20
15 October 2022
20:30 (IST)

Telugu Titans	26 – 46	Dabang Delhi
Vinay (9)	Report	Naveen Kumar (12)

Dabang Delhi won

Match 21
15 October 2022
21:30 (IST)

Bengal Warriors	54 – 26	Patna Pirates
Maninder Singh (12)	Report	Sachin Tanwar (12)

Bengal Warriors won

Match 22
16 October 2022
19:30 (IST)

Puneri Paltan	30 – 28	U Mumba
Aslam Inamdar (8)	Report	Guman Singh (7)

Puneri Paltan won

Match 23
16 October 2022
20:30 (IST)

UP Yoddha	44 – 37	Bengaluru Bulls
Pardeep Narwal (14)	Report	Vikash Kandola (12)

UP Yoddha won

Match 24
17 October 2022
19:30 (IST)

Tamil Thalaivas	33 - 32	Patna Pirates
Himanshu Singh (11)	Report	Rohit Gulia (11)

Tamil Thalaivas won

Match 25
17 October 2022
20:30 (IST)

Dabang Delhi	38 – 36	Haryana Steelers
Naveen Kumar (15)	Report	Manjeet (11)

Dabang Delhi won

Match 26
18 October 2022
19:30 (IST)

Bengal Warriors	24 – 39	Jaipur Pink Panthers
Shrikant Jadhav (5)	Report	Arjun Deshwal (10)

Jaipur Pink Panthers won

Match 27
18 October 2022
20:30 (IST)

Telugu Titans	25 – 26	Puneri Paltan
Siddharth Desai (8)	Report	Mohit Goyat (10)

Puneri Paltan won

Match 28
19 October 2022
19:30 (IST)

Gujarat Giants	51 – 45	UP Yoddha
Chandran Ranjit (19)	Report	Pardeep Narwal (17)

Gujarat Giants won

Match 29
19 October 2022
20:30 (IST)

Bengaluru Bulls	45 – 28	Tamil Thalaivas
Bharat (11)	Report	Narender (9)

Bengaluru Bulls won

Match 30
21 October 2022
19:30 (IST)

U Mumba	32 – 31	Haryana Steelers
Guman Singh (9)	Report	Meetu Sharma (4)

U Mumba won

Match 31
21 October 2022
20:30 (IST)

Puneri Paltan	27 – 25	Bengal Warriors
Aslam Inamdar (5)	Report	Maninder Singh (6)

Puneri Paltan won

Match 32
21 October 2022
21:30 (IST)

Patna Pirates	37 – 33	Dabang Delhi
Rohit Gulia (13)	Report	Naveen Kumar (13)

Patna Pirates won

Match 33
22 October 2022
19:30 (IST)

U Mumba	32 – 42	Bengaluru Bulls
Guman Singh (11)	Report	Bharat (16)

Bengaluru Bulls won

Match 34
22 October 2022
20:30 (IST)

Jaipur Pink Panthers	51 – 27	Telugu Titans
Arjun Deshwal (12)	Report	Adarsh T (9)

Jaipur Pink Panthers won

Match 35
22 October 2022
21:30 (IST)

Haryana Steelers	38 – 42	Gujarat Giants
Meetu Sharma (16)	Report	H.S. Rakesh (18)

Gujarat Giants won

Match 36
23 October 2022
19:30 (IST)

Bengaluru Bulls	31 – 31	Patna Pirates
Bharat (11)	Report	Rohit Gulia (8)

Match drawn

Match 37
23 October 2022
20:30 (IST)

UP Yoddha	41 – 24	Tamil Thalaivas
Pardeep Narwal (6)	Report	Himanshu (6)

UP Yoddha won

Match 38
25 October 2022
19:30 (IST)

Puneri Paltan	32 – 24	Jaipur Pink Panthers
Aslam Inamdar (13)	Report	Arjun Deshwal (7)

Puneri Paltan won

Match 39
25 October 2022
20:30 (IST)

Telugu Titans	24 – 43	Haryana Steelers
Siddharth Desai (5)	Report	Meetu Sharma (13)

Haryana Steelers won

Match 40
26 October 2022
19:30 (IST)

Gujarat Giants	29 – 37	U Mumba
H.S. Rakesh (12)	Report	Guman Singh (12)

U Mumba won

Match 41
26 October 2022
20:30 (IST)

Dabang Delhi	30 – 35	Bengal Warriors
Naveen Kumar (10)	Report	Maninder Singh (9)

Bengal Warriors won

=== Leg 2 – Shree Shiv Chhatrapati Sports Complex, Pune ===
Match 42
28 October 2022
19:30 (IST)

Tamil Thalaivas	38 – 27	Jaipur Pink Panthers
Narender (13)	Report	Arjun Deshwal (9)

Tamil Thalaivas won

Match 43
28 October 2022
20:30 (IST)

Haryana Steelers	27 – 27	Puneri Paltan
Manjeet (8)	Report	Mohit Goyat (11)

Match drawn

Match 44
28 October 2022
21:30 (IST)

Patna Pirates	34 – 29	UP Yoddha
Sachin Tanwar (11)	Report	Pardeep Narwal (12)

Patna Pirates won

Match 45
29 October 2022
19:30 (IST)

Bengaluru Bulls	47 – 43	Dabang Delhi
Bharat (20)	Report	Naveen Kumar (16)

Bengaluru Bulls won

Match 46
29 October 2022
20:30 (IST)

Telugu Titans	19 – 30	Gujarat Giants
Monu Goyat (2)	Report	Parteek Dahiya (6)

Gujarat Giants won

Match 47
29 October 2022
21:30 (IST)

Bengal Warriors	25 – 36	U Mumba
Shrikant Jadhav (8)	Report	Ashish Narwal (8)

U Mumba won

Match 48
30 October 2022
19:30 (IST)

Jaipur Pink Panthers	31 – 37	Bengaluru Bulls
Arjun Deshwal (10)	Report	Bharat (10)

Bengaluru Bulls won

Match 49
30 October 2022
20:30 (IST)

Tamil Thalaivas	49 – 39	Dabang Delhi
Narender (23)	Report	Ashu Malik (14)

Tamil Thalaivas won

Match 50
31 October 2022
19:30 (IST)

Gujarat Giants	28 – 34	Patna Pirates
Parteek Dahiya (9)	Report	Sachin Tanwar (13)

Patna Pirates won

Match 51
31 October 2022
20:30 (IST)

UP Yoddha	43 – 24	Telugu Titans
Surender Gill (13)	Report	Adarsh T (5)

UP Yoddha won

Match 52
1 November 2022
19:30 (IST)

Puneri Paltan	43 – 38	Dabang Delhi
Akash Shinde (13)	Report	Naveen Kumar (15)

Puneri Paltan won

Match 53
1 November 2022
20:30 (IST)

Haryana Steelers	29 – 27	Bengaluru Bulls
Meetu Sharma (9)	Report	Bharat (10)

Haryana Steelers won

Match 54
2 November 2022
19:30 (IST)

U Mumba	40 – 37	Telugu Titans
Ashish Narwal (11)	Report	Siddharth Desai (17)

U Mumba won

Match 55
2 November 2022
20:30 (IST)

Bengal Warriors	41 – 41	Tamil Thalaivas
Maninder Singh (19)	Report	Narender (15)

Match drawn

Match 56
4 November 2022
19:30 (IST)

Patna Pirates	34 – 31	U Mumba
Sachin Tanwar (12)	Report	Jai Bhagwan (7)

Patna Pirates won

Match 57
4 November 2022
20:30 (IST)

Dabang Delhi	40 – 45	Jaipur Pink Panthers
Ashu Malik (14)	Report	Arjun Deshwal (16)

Jaipur Pink Panthers won

Match 58
4 November 2022
21:30 (IST)

UP Yoddha	31 – 40	Puneri Paltan
Surender Gill (12)	Report	Akash Shinde (15)

Puneri Paltan won

Match 59
5 November 2022
19:30 (IST)

Gujarat Giants	40 – 45	Bengal Warriors
Parteek Dahiya (11)	Report	Maninder Singh (20)

Bengal Warriors won

Match 60
5 November 2022
20:30 (IST)

Tamil Thalaivas	39 – 31	Telugu Titans
Ajinkya Pawar (11)	Report	Siddharth Desai (14)

Tamil Thalaivas won

Match 61
5 November 2022
21:30 (IST)

Haryana Steelers	36 – 36	UP Yoddha
Meetu Sharma (12)	Report	Surender Gill (13)

Match drawn

Match 62
6 November 2022
19:30 (IST)

Bengaluru Bulls	44 – 46	Gujarat Giants
Bharat (13)	Report	Parteek Dahiya (15)

Gujarat Giants won

Match 63
6 November 2022
20:30 (IST)

Puneri Paltan	34 – 35	Tamil Thalaivas
Aslam Inamdar (13)	Report	Narender (13)

Tamil Thalaivas won

Match 64
7 November 2022
19:30 (IST)

U Mumba	39 – 42	Jaipur Pink Panthers
Ashish Narwal (11)	Report	Arjun Deshwal (15)

Jaipur Pink Panthers won

Match 65
7 November 2022
20:30 (IST)

Patna Pirates	41 – 32	Haryana Steelers
Sachin Tanwar (13)	Report	Manjeet (10)

Patna Pirates won

Match 66
8 November 2022
19:30 (IST)

Bengal Warriors	41 – 41	UP Yoddha
Maninder Singh (18)	Report	Rohit Tomar (16)

Match drawn

Match 67
8 November 2022
20:30 (IST)

Dabang Delhi	40 – 33	Telugu Titans
Ashu Malik (12)	Report	Siddharth Desai (14)

Dabang Delhi won

Match 68
9 November 2022
19:30 (IST)

Bengaluru Bulls	36 – 33	Haryana Steelers
Neeraj Narwal (9)	Report	Meetu Sharma (10)

Bengaluru Bulls won

Match 69
9 November 2022
20:30 (IST)

Tamil Thalaivas	34 – 35	Puneri Paltan
Narender (10)	Report	Akash Shinde (10)

Puneri Paltan won

Match 70
11 November 2022
19:30 (IST)

UP Yoddha	40 – 34	Haryana Steelers
Surender Gill (11)	Report	Manjeet (11)

UP Yoddha won

Match 71
11 November 2022
20:30 (IST)

U Mumba	34 – 33	Puneri Paltan
Guman Singh (13)	Report	Mohit Goyat (11)

U Mumba won

Match 72
11 November 2022
21:30 (IST)

Patna Pirates	37 – 30	Jaipur Pink Panthers
Rohit Gulia (9)	Report	Arjun Deshwal (13)

Patna Pirates won

Match 73
12 November 2022
19:30 (IST)

Bengal Warriors	46 – 27	Gujarat Giants
Maninder Singh (12)	Report	Chandran Ranjith (8)

Bengal Warriors

Match 74
12 November 2022
20:30 (IST)

Telugu Titans	30 – 41	UP Yoddha
Siddharth Desai (11)	Report	Surender Gill (12)

UP Yoddha won

Match 75
12 November 2022
21:30 (IST)

Jaipur Pink Panthers	57 – 32	Dabang Delhi
Rahul Chaudhari (13)	Report	Vijay Malik (11)

Jaipur Pink Panthers won

Match 76
13 November 2022
19:30 (IST)

U Mumba	36 – 23	Patna Pirates
Guman Singh (13)	Report	Rohit Gulia (7)

U Mumba won

Match 77
13 November 2022
20:30 (IST)

Tamil Thalaivas	34 – 40	Bengaluru Bulls
Narender (9)	Report	Bharat (14)

Bengaluru Bulls won

Match 78
14 November 2022
19:30 (IST)

Bengal Warriors	27 – 43	Puneri Paltan
Maninder Singh (14)	Report	Akash Shinde (9)

Puneri Paltan won

Match 79
14 November 2022
20:30 (IST)

Gujarat Giants	32 – 33	Haryana Steelers
Chandran Ranjith (8)	Report	Manjeet (14)

Haryana Steelers won

Match 80
15 November 2022
19:30 (IST)

Jaipur Pink Panthers	32 – 22	U Mumba
Arjun Deshwal (13)	Report	Guman Singh (4)

Jaipur Pink Panthers won

Match 81
15 November 2022
20:30 (IST)

Telugu Titans	38 – 49	Bengaluru Bulls
Siddharth Desai (18)	Report	Bharat (16)

Bengaluru Bulls won

Match 82
16 November 2022
19:30 (IST)

Patna Pirates	33 – 33	Tamil Thalaivas
Sachin Tanwar (13)	Report	Narender (15)

Match drawn

Match 83
16 November 2022
20:30 (IST)

Dabang Delhi	31 – 50	UP Yoddha
Vijay Malik (13)	Report	Pardeep Narwal (22)

UP Yoddha won

=== Leg 3 – Gachibowli Indoor Stadium, Hyderabad ===
Match 84
18 November 2022
19:30 (IST)

Puneri Paltan	41 – 28	Haryana Steelers
Mohit Goyat (10)	Report	K. Prapanjan (8)

Puneri Paltan won

Match 85
18 November 2022
20:30 (IST)

Bengal Warriors	36 – 28	Telugu Titans
Maninder Singh (12)	Report	Abhishek Singh (9)

Bengal Warriors won

Match 86
18 November 2022
21:30 (IST)

Gujarat Giants	38 – 45	Bengaluru Bulls
Chandran Ranjith (12)	Report	Bharat (18)

Bengaluru Bulls won

Match 87
19 November 2022
19:30 (IST)

UP Yoddha	29 – 42	Jaipur Pink Panthers
Pardeep Narwal (14)	Report	Arjun Deshwal (19)

Jaipur Pink Panthers won

Match 88
19 November 2022
20:30 (IST)

Telugu Titans	32 – 26	U Mumba
Siddharth Desai (9)	Report	Guman Singh (8)

Telugu Titans won

Match 89
19 November 2022
21:30 (IST)

Dabang Delhi	30 – 27	Patna Pirates
Vijay Malik (7)	Report	Rohit Gulia (3)

Dabang Delhi won

Match 90
20 November 2022
19:30 (IST)

Haryana Steelers	30 – 42	Dabang Delhi
K. Prapanjan (9)	Report	Naveen Kumar (14)

Dabang Delhi won

Match 91
20 November 2022
20:30 (IST)

Bengaluru Bulls	33 – 35	Puneri Paltan
Bharat (9)	Report	Akash Shinde (6)

Puneri Paltan won

Match 92
21 November 2022
19:30 (IST)

Tamil Thalaivas	35 – 30	Bengal Warriors
Narender (13)	Report	Maninder Singh (15)

Tamil Thalaivas won

Match 93
21 November 2022
20:30 (IST)

UP Yoddha	35 – 31	Gujarat Giants
Pardeep Narwal (9)	Report	Parteek Dahiya (10)

UP Yoddha won

Match 94
22 November 2022
19:30 (IST)

U Mumba	20 – 34	Tamil Thalaivas
Guman Singh (4)	Report	Narender (7)

Tamil Thalaivas won

Match 95
22 November 2022
20:30 (IST)

Telugu Titans	35 – 36	Patna Pirates
Siddharth Desai (15)	Report	Sachin Tanwar (14)

Patna Pirates won

Match 96
23 November 2022
19:30 (IST)

Jaipur Pink Panthers	32 – 39	Puneri Paltan
Arjun Deshwal (19)	Report	Aslam Inamdar (9)

Puneri Paltan won

Match 97
23 November 2022
20:30 (IST)

Bengal Warriors	41 – 38	Bengaluru Bulls
Maninder Singh (11)	Report	Bharat (10)

Bengal Warriors won

Match 98
25 November 2022
19:30 (IST)

Gujarat Giants	47 – 50	Dabang Delhi
Parteek Dahiya (20)	Report	Ashu Malik (11)

Dabang Delhi won

Match 99
25 November 2022
20:30 (IST)

Jaipur Pink Panthers	41 – 26	Tamil Thalaivas
Arjun Deshwal (12)	Report	Himanshu (5)

Jaipur Pink Panthers won

Match 100
25 November 2022
21:30 (IST)

Haryana Steelers	33 – 23	Patna Pirates
Manjeet (10)	Report	Rohit Gulia (11)

Haryana Steelers won

Match 101
26 November 2022
19:30 (IST)

U Mumba	49 – 41	Bengal Warriors
Guman Singh (14)	Report	Maninder Singh (13)

U Mumba won

Match 102
26 November 2022
20:30 (IST)

Puneri Paltan	38 – 25	Telugu Titans
Aslam Inamdar (8)	Report	Adarsh T (7)

Puneri Paltan won

Match 103
26 November 2022
21:30 (IST)

UP Yoddha	35 – 33	Patna Pirates
Pardeep Narwal (15)	Report	Rohit Gulia (12)

UP Yoddha won

Match 104
27 November 2022
19:30 (IST)

Tamil Thalaivas	42 – 39	Gujarat Giants
Narender (13)	Report	Parteek Dahiya (10)

Tamil Thalaivas won

Match 105
27 November 2022
20:30 (IST)

Dabang Delhi	49 – 52	Bengaluru Bulls
Vijay Malik (14)	Report	Bharat (23)

Bengaluru Bulls won

Match 106
28 November 2022
19:30 (IST)

UP Yoddha	33 – 32	Bengal Warriors
Pardeep Narwal (14)	Report	Maninder Singh (10)

UP Yoddha won

Match 107
28 November 2022
20:30 (IST)

Telugu Titans	28 – 48	Jaipur Pink Panthers
Adarsh T (3)	Report	Arjun Deshwal (18)

Jaipur Pink Panthers won

Match 108
29 November 2022
19:30 (IST)

Puneri Paltan	39 - 51	Gujarat Giants
Akash Shinde (9)	Report	Parteek Dahiya (19)

Gujarat Giants won

Match 109
29 November 2022
20:30 (IST)

Haryana Steelers	35 – 33	U Mumba
Manjeet (7)	Report	Ashish Narwal (6)

Haryana Steelers won

Match 110
30 November 2022
19:30 (IST)

Bengaluru Bulls	25 – 45	Jaipur Pink Panthers
Bharat (10)	Report	Arjun Deshwal (13)

Jaipur Pink Panthers won

Match 111
30 November 2022
20:30 (IST)

Dabang Delhi	37 – 37	Tamil Thalaivas
Naveen Kumar (15)	Report	Narender (14)

Match drawn

Match 112
2 December 2022
19:30 (IST)

UP Yoddha	38 – 28	U Mumba
Pardeep Narwal (13)	Report	Guman Singh (10)

UP Yoddha won

Match 113
2 December 2022
20:30 (IST)

Patna Pirates	34 – 40	Gujarat Giants
Rohit Gulia (12)	Report	Mahendra Ganesh Rajput (12)

Gujarat Giants won

Match 114
2 December 2022
21:30 (IST)

Haryana Steelers	32 – 26	Bengal Warriors
Meetu Sharma (6)	Report	Shrikant Jadhav (7)

Haryana Steelers won

Match 115
3 December 2022
19:30 (IST)

Dabang Delhi	44 - 47	Puneri Paltan
Naveen Kumar (16)	Report	Akash Shinde (16)

Puneri Paltan won

Match 116
3 December 2022
20:30 (IST)

Telugu Titans	24 – 52	Tamil Thalaivas
K. Hanumanthu (10)	Report	Ajinkya Pawar (20)

Tamil Thalaivas won

Match 117
3 December 2022
21:30 (IST)

Jaipur Pink Panthers	57 – 31	Bengal Warriors
Arjun Deshwal (22)	Report	Shrikant Jadhav (16)

Jaipur Pink Panthers won

Match 118
4 December 2022
19:30 (IST)

U Mumba	36 – 38	Gujarat Giants
Pranay Vinay Rane (10)	Report	Parteek Dahiya (13)

Gujarat Giants won

Match 119
4 December 2022
20:30 (IST)

Bengaluru Bulls	38 – 35	UP Yoddha
Bharat (8)	Report	Pardeep Narwal (10)

Bengaluru Bulls won

Match 120
5 December 2022
19:30 (IST)

Puneri Paltan	44 – 30	Patna Pirates
Akash Shinde (13)	Report	Sachin Tanwar (10)

Puneri Paltan won

Match 121
5 December 2022
20:30 (IST)

Jaipur Pink Panthers	44 – 30	Haryana Steelers
V. Ajith Kumar (13)	Report	Manjeet (8)

Jaipur Pink Panthers won

Match 122
6 December 2022
19:30 (IST)

U Mumba	24 – 41	Dabang Delhi
Ashish Narwal (4)	Report	Naveen Kumar (5)

Dabang Delhi won

Match 123
6 December 2022
20:30 (IST)

Gujarat Giants	44 – 30	Telugu Titans
Parteek Dahiya (17)	Report	Abhishek Singh (9)

Gujarat Giants won

Match 124
7 December 2022
19:30 (IST)

Patna Pirates	44 – 57	Bengaluru Bulls
Rohit Gulia (10)	Report	Bharat (20)

Bengaluru Bulls won

Match 125
7 December 2022
20:30 (IST)

Tamil Thalaivas	43 – 28	UP Yoddha
Narender (10)	Report	Durgesh Kumar (7)

Tamil Thalaivas won

Match 126
8 December 2022
19:30 (IST)

Bengal Warriors	46 – 46	Dabang Delhi
Maninder Singh (18)	Report	Naveen Kumar (16)

Match drawn

Match 127
8 December 2022
20:30 (IST)

Haryana Steelers	50 – 33	Telugu Titans
Rakesh Narwal (11)	Report	Abhishek Singh (9)

Haryana Steelers won

Match 128
9 December 2022
19:30 (IST)

Gujarat Giants	51 – 51	Jaipur Pink Panthers
Sonu Jaglan (12)	Report	Arjun Deshwal (17)

Match drawn

Match 129
9 December 2022
20:30 (IST)

Puneri Paltan	41 – 45	UP Yoddha
Aditya Shinde (12)	Report	Durgesh Kumar (5)

UP Yoddha won

Match 130
10 December 2022
19:30 (IST)

Bengaluru Bulls	30 – 36	U Mumba
Sachin Narwal (7)	Report	Jai Bhagwan (11)

U Mumba won

Match 131
10 December 2022
20:30 (IST)

Tamil Thalaivas	38 – 61	Haryana Steelers
Himanshu (8)	Report	Sushil (12)

Haryana Steelers won

Match 132
10 December 2022
21:30 (IST)

Patna Pirates	49 – 38	Bengal Warriors
Ranjit Naik (9)	Report	Akash Pikalmunde (11)

Patna Pirates won

== Playoffs ==
Eliminators
Eliminator 1
Bengaluru Bulls	56
Dabang Delhi	24
Eliminator 2
UP Yoddha	36 (4)
Tamil Thalaivas	36 (6)

Semi-finals
Semi-final 1
Jaipur Pink Panthers	49
Bengaluru Bulls	29
Semi-final 2
Puneri Paltan	39
Tamil Thalaivas	37

Final
Jaipur Pink Panthers	33
Puneri Paltan	29

=== Eliminator 1 ===
Match 133
13 December 2022
19:30 (IST)

Bengaluru Bulls	56 – 24	Dabang Delhi
Bharat (15)	Report	Naveen Kumar (8)

Bengaluru Bulls won

=== Eliminator 2 ===
Match 134
13 December 2022
20:30 (IST)

UP Yoddha	36 – 36 4 – 6	Tamil Thalaivas
Pardeep Narwal (12)	Report	Narender (12)

Match drawn
Tamil Thalaivas won the Tie-Breaker

=== Semi Final 1 ===
Match 135
15 December 2022
19:30 (IST)

Jaipur Pink Panthers	49 – 29	Bengaluru Bulls
V. Ajith Kumar (13)	Report	Bharat (7)

Jaipur Pink Panthers won

=== Semi Final 2 ===
Match 136
15 December 2022
20:30 (IST)

Puneri Paltan	39 – 37	Tamil Thalaivas
Pankaj Mohite (15)	Report	Narender (11)

Puneri Paltan won

=== Final ===
Match 137
17 December 2022
20:30 (IST)

Jaipur Pink Panthers	33 – 29	Puneri Paltan
V. Ajith Kumar (6)	Report	Aditya Shinde (5)

Jaipur Pink Panthers won

== Statistics ==
=== Most Raid Points ===
Rank	Player	Team	Matches	Raid Points
1	(India) Arjun Deshwal	Jaipur Pink Panthers	24	296
2	(India) Bharat	Bengaluru Bulls	23	279
3	(India) Naveen Kumar	Dabang Delhi	23	254
4	(India) Narender	Tamil Thalaivas	23	243
5	(India) Maninder Singh	Bengal Warriors	21	238
As of 17 December 2022.

=== Most Tackle Points ===
Rank	Player	Team	Matches	Tackle Points
1	(India) Ankush	Jaipur Pink Panthers	24	89
2	(Iran) Mohammadreza Chiyaneh	Patna Pirates	20	84
3	(India) Saurabh Nandal	Bengaluru Bulls	24	72
4	(India) Aman	Bengaluru Bulls	24	60
5	(India) Rinku	U Mumba	19	59
As of 17 December 2022.

=== Total Points ===
Rank	Player	Team	Matches	Raid Points
1	(India) Arjun Deshwal	Jaipur Pink Panthers	24	296
2	(India) Bharat	Bengaluru Bulls	23	282
3	(India) Naveen Kumar	Dabang Delhi	23	258
4	(India) Narender	Tamil Thalaivas	23	249
5	(India) Maninder Singh	Bengal Warriors	21	240
As of 17 December 2022.
