= Monu Goyat =

Kabaddi player

Naib Subedar Monu Goyat
Personal information
- National team: India
- Born: 16 October 1994 (age 31) Kungar, Bhiwani district, Haryana
- Military career
- Allegiance: India
- Branch: Indian Army
- Rank: Naib Subedar

Sport
- League: Pro Kabaddi League
- Club: Patna Pirates
- Team: India national kabaddi team
Medal record
Men's Kabaddi
Representing India
2018 Asian Games
Bronze medal – third place	2018 Jakarta	Team
- Updated on 28 June 2019

Naib Subedar Monu Goyat is an Indian kabaddi player and an Indian Army Junior Commissioned Officer (JCO). He was part of the India national kabaddi team that won a bronze medal at the 2018 Asian Games. He will play for Patna Pirates again in the Pro Kabaddi League 2021 starting from 22 Dec. Goyat was part of Patna Pirates' triumphant 2017 Pro Kabaddi League season and was the most expensive purchase in the 2018–19 Pro Kabaddi League season at ₹15.1 million (US$160,000).

== Early life ==
Born in Kungar village of Haryana's Bhiwani district, Goyat started playing kabaddi at age ten after he was influenced by his uncle Vijender Singh, a former kabaddi player. Singh gave him initial training. After joining the army in 2011, he was coached by Jasvir Singh. Representing Services Sports Control Board, he helped his side reach the final of the 65th Senior National Championships in 2017. A resident of Hansi, Haryana, Goyat made his debut for India at the 2018 Dubai Kabaddi Masters.

== Kabaddi career ==
=== Season 4 ===
Goyat made his debut in Pro Kabaddi League playing for the Bengal Warriors. He scored 59 points in 13 games and was among the top 15 raiders in the league. He was one of the primary raiders for the Bengal Warriors.

=== Season 5 ===
Goyat was bought by the Patna Pirates for the 2017 Pro Kabaddi League season and had a fruitful year with the team, scoring 191 raid points in 26 matches with an average of 7.34 points per match, finishing as the fourth highest scoring raider in the league. Of those 191 raid points, he scored 45 in do-or-die situations, making him the second most successful raider in this category.

=== Season 6 ===
Monu Goyat became the biggest purchase in the history of the league when he was bagged by the Haryana Steelers for ₹15.1 million (US$160,000) in the 2018–19 Pro Kabaddi League season. He captained the side in the absence of Surender Nada. Goyat scored 160 raid points in 20 matches with an average of 8 raid points per match.

=== Season 7 ===
Monu Goyat was bought by UP Yoddhas for 93 lakhs in the 2019 Pro Kabaddi League Season 7 auction. In PKL 7, he played 14 matches and scored a total of 70 points with a 43% raid strike rate.

=== Season 8 ===
In Pro Kabaddi Season 8, Monu Goyat was released by the UP Yoddhas team for the Pro Kabaddi League Season 8 auction. In the 2021-22 Pro Kabaddi League season auction, Monu was bought by Patna Pirates for a base price of 20 lakhs. He played 14 matches for Patna Pirates and scored a total of 93 points.

=== International ===
He was part of the India national kabaddi team that won a bronze medal at the 2018 Asian Games.
