= Bosk =

Bosk may refer to:

- Bosk or Baška, Košice-okolie District, a village and municipality in Kosice Region, Slovakia
- Bosk of Port Kar, a character in the Gor series by John Norman

== See also ==
- Bosque, a type of gallery forest habitat
- Bosc (disambiguation)
