= Bison Kaalamaadan =

- Theatrical release poster
- Directed by: Mari Selvaraj
- Written by: Mari Selvaraj
- Produced by: Sameer Nair; Deepak Seigal; Pa. Ranjith; Aditi Anand
- Starring: Dhruv Vikram; Pasupathy; Ameer; Lal; Anupama Parameswaran; Rajisha Vijayan
- Cinematography: Ezhil Arasu K
- Edited by: Sakthi Thiru
- Music by: Nivas K. Prasanna
- Production companies: Applause Entertainment; Neelam Studios
- Distributed by: Five Star Creations
- Release date: 17 October 2025
- Running time: 168 minutes
- Country: India
- Language: Tamil
- Budget: est. ₹30 crore
- Box office: est. ₹75 crore

Bison Kaalamaadan is a 2025 Indian Tamil-language sports action drama film written and directed by Mari Selvaraj. It was jointly produced by Sameer Nair, Deepak Seigal, Pa. Ranjith and Aditi Anand under Applause Entertainment and Neelam Studios. The film stars Dhruv Vikram, leading an ensemble cast featuring Pasupathy, Ameer, Lal, Anupama Parameswaran, Rajisha Vijayan and Azhagam Perumal. Based on the life of kabaddi player Manathi Ganesan, it follows a man who strives to excel in the sport while overcoming caste-based discrimination.

The film was officially announced in December 2020 under the tentative title DV03, as it is Dhruv's third film as a lead actor, and the official title was announced in May 2024. Principal photography commenced the same month in Chennai and wrapped by mid February 2025. The film has music composed by Nivas K. Prasanna, cinematography handled by Ezhil Arasu K and editing by Sakthi Thiru.

Bison Kaalamaadan was released on 17 October 2025, coinciding with Diwali. The film received positive reviews from critics and became a major commercial success.

== Plot ==
The film is set against the tumultuous backdrop of 1994's caste-based violence and district rivalries. Kittan Velusamy is from a socially oppressed caste in rural Tamil Nadu. Driven by a passion for kabaddi, Kittan battles caste prejudice, violent feuds, powerful landlords who dominate every aspect of village life, and familial resistance as he chases his dream of representing India at the 1994 Asian Games.

Kittan finds direction when a committed kabaddi coach, Kandeeban, spots his raw talent and becomes his mentor, teaching him how to turn his anger into purpose on the kabaddi court. Despite being humiliated, attacked and repeatedly reminded of his marginalised identity, Kittan refuses to bend. His resilience transforms him into a symbol of defiance and hope known as Bison. His sister Raaji is the emotional centre of the household, steadying them when everything collapses around them, caught in the feud between two rival leaders, Pandiaraja, a local hero, and Kandasamy, a powerful landlord. In the end, Kittan rises above brutal hierarchies, fear and violence to become a national kabaddi champion, achieving his goal of representing Indian team in Asian Games.

== Cast ==
- Dhruv Vikram as "Vanaththi" Kittan
- Pasupathy as Velusamy, Kittan's father
- Ameer as Pandiaraja
- Lal as Kandasamy (voice dubbed by TNB Kathiravan)
- Anupama Parameswaran as Raani, Kittan's love interest
- Rajisha Vijayan as Raaji, Kittan's sister (voice dubbed by Raveena Ravi)
- Azhagam Perumal as Kandeeban
- Haritha Mutharasan as Pushpa
- K. Prapanjan as Rathinam
- Madhankumar Dhakshinamoorthy as Santhanraj
- Anurag Arora as Vishwesh Singh
- Puliyankulam Kannan as Sundaram
- Subatra Robert as Sundaram's wife
- Vishwadev Rachakonda as Dharan
- Lenin Bharathi as Coach of Win Paper Mill Kabaddi team
- Dhilip Subbarayan as Kandasamy Brother

== Production ==
=== Development ===
In March 2020, Dhruv Vikram, who debuted as an actor with Adithya Varma (2019), was reported to star in the lead role of Mari Selvaraj's directorial venture after Karnan (2021). E4 Entertainment, which produced Dhruv's debut film, would reportedly fund the venture. On 31 December, the collaboration of Dhruv and Mari was publicly announced through their respective social media accounts, tentatively titled DV03. A few days later, Pa. Ranjith announced he would produce the project under his banner Neelam Studios. Ranjith also funded Mari's directorial debut Pariyerum Perumal (2018).

Mari said that "The film is based on the life story of a sportsperson and this is going to showcase their lives in a raw and lively manner which has not been shown in Tamil cinema before". In April 2023, he said it was based on the life of the kabaddi player Manathi Ganesan. Production was set to begin after Dhruv completed filming for Mahaan (2022), as sports training was needed for his character.

In the meantime, Mari began working on Maamannan (2023). Dhruv began training by late August 2021, as he had completed filming for Mahaan. In 2023, reports claimed that the venture was shelved. However, Mari confirmed that works was still ongoing. On 12 March 2024, Applause Entertainment were announced to jointly fund the venture, and Anupama Parameswaran was announced in the lead female role.

The film's official title, Bison Kaalamaadan, was announced on 6 May 2024. The technical crew, consisting of composer Nivas K. Prasanna, cinematographer Ezhil Arasu K, editor Sakthi Thiru, art director Kumar Gangappan, action director Dhilip Subbarayan, costume designer Aegan Ekambaram and publicity designer Kabilan Chelliah, were announced by the production house's on the same day. Ahead of the film's release, Mari expressed regret for titling the film in English, saying he had been requested to do so by the producers to increase the film's reach.

=== Casting ===
Mari said that Dhruv was his only choice for the lead actor. Despite already having done films like Adithya Varma and Mahaan (2022), Dhruv considered Bison Kaalamaadan his true feature film debut as Adithya Varma was a remake of Arjun Reddy (where he was interpreting Vijay Deverakonda's role in his own style) and his role in Mahaan was small, but Bison Kaalamaadan was the first time he got to properly play a full-length original role. Although rural characters in Tamil films are usually depicted with dark complexion, Mari did not consider Dhruv's lighter complexion an obstacle to casting him. Anupama Parameswaran called Bison Kaalamaadan the first film for which she attended a "workshop"; she spent nearly two months interacting with local residents in the filming location to develop her character. Rajisha Vijayan, who earlier appeared in Mari's Karnan (2021), eagerly agreed to star in this film after her disappointment at not being approached for the films he had made between Karnan and Bison, adding that she had no issues playing a supporting role.

=== Filming ===
Principal photography began on 6 May 2024 with an inaugural puja at a film city in Chennai. Most of the film was shot in Dindigul and Rajapalayam. The first schedule concluded in late June. By September, filming was 75% complete, with the remaining 25% to take place either at the end of the year or in early 2025. One scene required Rajisha to jump into water, and she agreed despite her poor swimming skills. She almost drowned but was rescued by the crew. Filming wrapped on 17 February 2025.

== Music ==
The music and background score are composed by Nivas K. Prasanna. Five songs were released as singles from 1 September to 9 October 2025. The audio jukebox, including all five singles and an unplugged version of the third single "Cheenikkallu", was released on YouTube on 28 October 2025.

== Release ==
=== Theatrical ===
Bison Kaalamaadan was theatrically released on 17 October 2025, coinciding with Diwali. The film was distributed by Five Star K. Senthil in Tamil Nadu, and by Veedu Production in Malaysia.

=== Home media ===
The post-theatrical streaming rights were bought by Netflix. The film began streaming on Netflix from 21 November 2025.

== Reception ==
=== Critical response ===
Roopa Radhakrishnan of The Times of India gave the film 3.5/5 stars and wrote "First things first, Bison is not among its director's finest works. But the film, based on the life of kabaddi player Manathi Ganesan, is still effective and bears the signature stamp of its accomplished creator. [...] Bison, despite its flaws, is meaningful, ambitious and gripping." Avinash Ramachandran of Cinema Express gave the film 3/5 stars and wrote "Bison is a terrific exploration of the aftermath of violence and its unsettling consequences in the minds of the young and easily influenced." Janani K of India Today gave Bison 3/5 stars and wrote "'Bison' is a powerful story about caste politics and systemic oppression in a sports setup. The film is a solid addition to Mari Selvaraj's repertoire of work." Saibal Chatterjee of NDTV gave 3/5 stars and wrote "Dhruv Vikram demonstrates sustained patience and skill in capturing the arduous journey of Kittan. [...] Mari Selvaraj blends two dimensions of his film – sport and life as reflections of each other – and brings them alive in fascinating unison. Bison Kaalamaadan hits home with the coiled-up force of a muscular beast that never loses sight of its target."

Anusha Sundar of OTTPlay gave 3/5 stars and wrote "Bison upholds the filmography of Mari Selvaraj, and becomes a powerful commentary about the politics within the sports sphere. There is an undeniable truthfulness that the film offers, despite Bison being a film that takes its time to connect and resonate." Arjun Menon of The Indian Express gave 2.5/5 stars and wrote "Bison is a quintessential Mari Selvaraj film, albeit one slightly softened for the masses. Here, the filmmaker seeks to bridge his distinct political voice with his growing interest in accessible storytelling. Yet, Bison stands tall among his works, a fierce, deeply felt story powered by a career-defining performance from Dhruv Vikram." Bhuvanesh Chandar of The Hindu wrote "Mari's most commercially conventional film yet is a politically razor-sharp and tonally strong social sports drama that hits the bullseye every step of the way."

=== Box office ===
In India, Bison Kaalamaadan was released alongside Dude and Diesel. It opened to ₹2.30 crore (equivalent to ₹2.4 crore or US$250,000 in 2026) domestically, becoming the second highest opening among the releases. According to an estimate by The Times of India, the film ended its theatrical run with ₹75 crore (equivalent to ₹77 crore or US$8.3 million in 2026). In Malaysia, the film opened in sixth place at the box office and remained in the top ten for one week.
