= K. Prapanjan =

Indian kabaddi player

Personal information
- Nationality: Indian
- Born: 25 June 1994 (age 31) Sankagiri, Salem, Tamil Nadu, India
- Education: Salem Sri Ganesh arts and science college
- Occupation: Kabaddi player
- Height: 185 cm (6 ft 1 in)
- Weight: 83 kg (183 lb)

Sport
- Country: India
- Sport: Kabaddi
- Position: Raider
- Kabaddi: Pro Kabaddi League
- Club: U Mumba; Telugu Titans; Tamil Thalaivas; Gujarat Fortunegiants; Bengal Warriors; Tamil Thalaivas
- Team: India national kabaddi team
- Coached by: [R.Samyappan] E Bhaskaran; Kasinatha Baskaran

K. Prapanjan is a professional Indian Kabaddi player. He played for Tamil Thalaivas as a raider in Season 8 of Pro Kabaddi League.

== Early life ==
He was born in Sangagiri, Tamil Nadu, India.

== Pro Kabaddi League ==
He played for U Mumba in Season 3, Telugu Titans in Season 4, Tamil Thalaivas in Season 5, Gujarat Fortunegiants in Season 6. He was bought for 55.5 lakhs by Bengal Warriors in the 2019 auction. In PKL 2021 auction for season 8, he has been bought for 71 lakhs by Tamil thalaivas.. He is currently in the Commentary Panel of Star Sports Tamil for Season 12.

== Acting ==
He acted in the 2025 Tamil sports action drama movie Bison Kaalamaadan.
