= Manathi Ganesan =

Indian kabaddi player and Arjuna Award winner

P. Ganesan
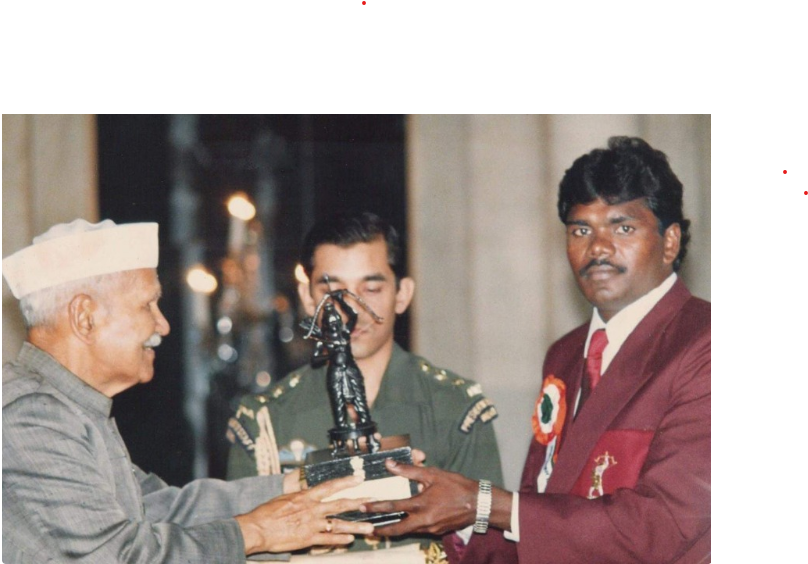
- P. Ganesan receiving the Arjuna Award (1995)

Personal information
- Full name: Perumal Ganesan
- Nationality: India
- Born: Manathi, Thoothukudi district, Tamil Nadu, India
- Years active: Late 1980s–1990s

Sport
- Country: India
- Sport: Kabaddi
- Position: Raider
Medal record
Men's kabaddi
Representing India
Asian Games
Gold medal – first place	1994 Asian Games	Team

P. Ganesan, popularly known as Manathi Ganesan, is an Indian former kabaddi player from Tamil Nadu who was part of the Indian men's team that won the gold medal at the 1994 Asian Games in Hiroshima. He received the Arjuna Award in 1995 for his contributions to kabaddi.

== Early life ==
Ganesan was born in the village of Manathi in present-day Thoothukudi district of Tamil Nadu. He was initially active in local-level sports before taking up kabaddi seriously in the late 1980s. His powerful raiding style and village-based training earned him the nickname "Manathi Ganesan".

== Playing career ==
=== Domestic career ===
Ganesan rose through district-level tournaments in southern Tamil Nadu, representing local clubs and departmental teams. He played for Sun Paper Mills, one of the strongest kabaddi sides in Tamil Nadu during the era, gaining visibility as a high-impact raider.

He later joined the sports quota of the Tamil Nadu Electricity Board (now TANGEDCO), continuing to play in state and national competitions representing departmental teams.

=== International career ===
Ganesan was selected to the Indian national men's kabaddi team in the early 1990s. He competed at the 1994 Asian Games in Hiroshima, where the Indian team won the gold medal in men's kabaddi, continuing India's dominance in the sport.

== Style of play ==
Tamil-language media described Ganesan as a physically dominant player, known for forceful raids and powerful blocks that earned him the "Bison-like" reputation later used in portrayals of his life.

== Awards and honours ==
- Arjuna Award – 1995 (Kabaddi)
- Gold medal – Men's Kabaddi, 1994 Asian Games

== Later life ==
Following his playing career, Ganesan worked as a Senior Sports Officer in TANGEDCO and continued mentoring kabaddi athletes in Tamil Nadu. He has been a guest at several kabaddi events and is regarded as an important figure in the sport's development in the region.

== In popular culture ==
In 2025, Tamil film-maker Mari Selvaraj released Bison Kaalamaadan, which was widely reported as being inspired by the life of Manathi P. Ganesan. Actor Dhruv Vikram trained in kabaddi for the role, with Ganesan providing guidance to the production team.
