= RR Kabel =

Indian manufacturer of wires, cables and consumer electrical products

- Type: Public company
- Traded as: BSE: 543981; NSE: RRKABEL
- Industry: Electrical wires, cables, and consumer electrical products
- Predecessor: Ram Ratna Group
- Founded: 1995
- Founder: Rameshwarlal Kabra
- Area served: 80+ countries
- Revenue: ₹9,722.40 crore (US$1.0 billion) (FY 2025–26) ₹7,618.23 crore (US$790 million) (FY 2024–25)
- Net income: ₹492.20 crore (US$51 million) (FY 2025–26) ₹311.61 crore (US$32 million) (FY 2024–25)
- Website: www.rrkabel.com

RR Kabel is an Indian manufacturer of wires, cables, and consumer electrical products. It is headquartered in Mumbai, Maharashtra. The company operates in two segments: wires and cables, and fast-moving electrical goods (FMEG), such as fans, lighting, switches, and appliances. It is among the largest exporters of wires and cables from India. The company is listed on the Bombay Stock Exchange and the National Stock Exchange of India.

== History ==
RR Kabel began with the Ram Ratna Group, a Mumbai-based family business founded by Rameshwarlal Kabra. The group manufactured winding wire in the 1960s and expanded into export trading through Ram Ratna International in the early 1990s. It entered the wires and cables business in 1995. The RR Kabel brand was launched in 1999 with a manufacturing facility at Silvassa in Dadra and Nagar Haveli. A second major plant opened at Waghodia in Gujarat later. The company added manufacturing units in Roorkee, Uttarakhand, and Bengaluru, and established an overseas factory in Bangladesh to produce enamelled wires and low-voltage cables.

In September 2019, private equity firm TPG Capital acquired a minority stake in the company for approximately ₹650 crore (US$67 million).

RR Kabel became a publicly traded company in September 2023.

In April 2025, the company's board terminated the employment of chief executive Dinesh Aggarwal. Aggarwal filed a commercial suit against RR Kabel in the Bombay High Court in June 2025. He sought ₹25 crore (US$2.6 million) in damages and described his termination as premature and wrongful.

== Operations ==
RR Kabel manufactures wires and cables for residential, commercial, industrial, and infrastructure use. Its product line includes low-smoke, zero-halogen (LSOH) insulated cables. The company says it was the first to introduce this technology in the Indian market. The wires and cables segment accounts for the substantial majority of the company's revenue.

The FMEG segment produces fans, lighting products, switches, and other consumer electrical appliances. It is a smaller but growing part of the business.

The company exports to markets in more than 80 countries.

Manufacturing is concentrated at facilities in Silvassa and Waghodia, with additional units in Roorkee and Bengaluru. In 2025, the company's board approved a capital expenditure plan of roughly ₹1,450 crore (US$150 million) to expand capacity at the Waghodia and Silvassa facilities.

== Awards and recognition ==
RR Kabel was founded by Rameshwarlal Kabra, who received the Padma Shri in 2018 for his contributions to trade and industry.

RR Kabel was ranked #327 in the 2025 Fortune 500 India list, #335 in 2024, and #356 in 2023.
