= Ankushapur, Ranga Reddy district =

Ankushapur
- Village
- Nickname: ankaspuram
- Location in Telangana, India
- Coordinates: 17°26′52″N 78°43′34″E
- Country: India
- State: Telangana

Government
  - Body: Gram panchayat

Area
  - Total: 8.45 km^{2} (3.26 sq mi)

Population (2001)
  - Total: 2,445
  - Density: 289/km^{2} (749/sq mi)

Languages
  - Official: Telugu
- Time zone: UTC+5:30 (IST)
- Postal code: 501301
- Telephone code: 08415
- Vehicle registration: TS 08 XX XXXX
- Website: https://medchal-malkajgiri.telangana.gov.in/ghatkesar-gram-panchayat-profile

Ankushapur is a village in Medchal-Malkajgiri District in Telangana, India. It falls under Ghatkesar mandal. The village is home to some engineering colleges. The total geographical area of village is 845 hectares. Ankushapur has a population of 7,645 peoples. There are about 2,764 houses in Ankushapur village. Hyderabad is nearest town to Ankushapur which is approximately 30 km away.
