= Aparna Baskaran =

Indian and American physicist

- Education: University of Florida
- Scientific career
- Fields: Statistical mechanics; Soft matter
- Workplaces: Brandeis University; Syracuse University
- Thesis: Statistical mechanics and linear response for a granular fluid (2006)
- Doctoral advisor: James W. Dufty
- Website: www.brandeis.edu/physics/people/profiles/baskaran-aparna.html

Aparna Baskaran is an Indian and American theoretical physicist whose research studies the statistical mechanics of soft matter, including the self-propelled motion of bacteria through fluids and the clustering of self-propelled particles. She is a professor in the Martin A. Fisher School of Physics at Brandeis University.

== Education and career ==
Baskaran earned a master's degree in physics at the Raman School of Physics of Pondicherry University in India. She completed her Ph.D. at the University of Florida in 2006. Her dissertation, Statistical mechanics and linear response for a granular fluid, was supervised by James W. Dufty.

After postdoctoral research at Syracuse University she joined the Brandeis University faculty as an assistant professor in 2010, and subsequently became a full professor there.

== Recognition ==
Baskaran was the 2019 recipient of the Early Career Award for Soft Matter Research of the American Physical Society (APS). She was elected as a Fellow of the American Physical Society in 2024, after a nomination from the APS Division of Soft Matter, "for seminal contributions exploiting nonequilibrium statistical physics to elucidate the physics of active and granular matter".
