= Commando A Baskaran =

Indian politician

A. Baskaran (also known as A. Baskaran of AIADMK) is the Chairman of Tiruvallur town.

Baskaran was the AIADMK candidate for Tiruvallur constituency in the 2016 Tamil Nadu Legislative Assembly elections. He is currently the Thiruvallur district AIADMK vice secretary.
