= Baskaran Pillai =

Indian-born American spiritual teacher, scholar and inventor

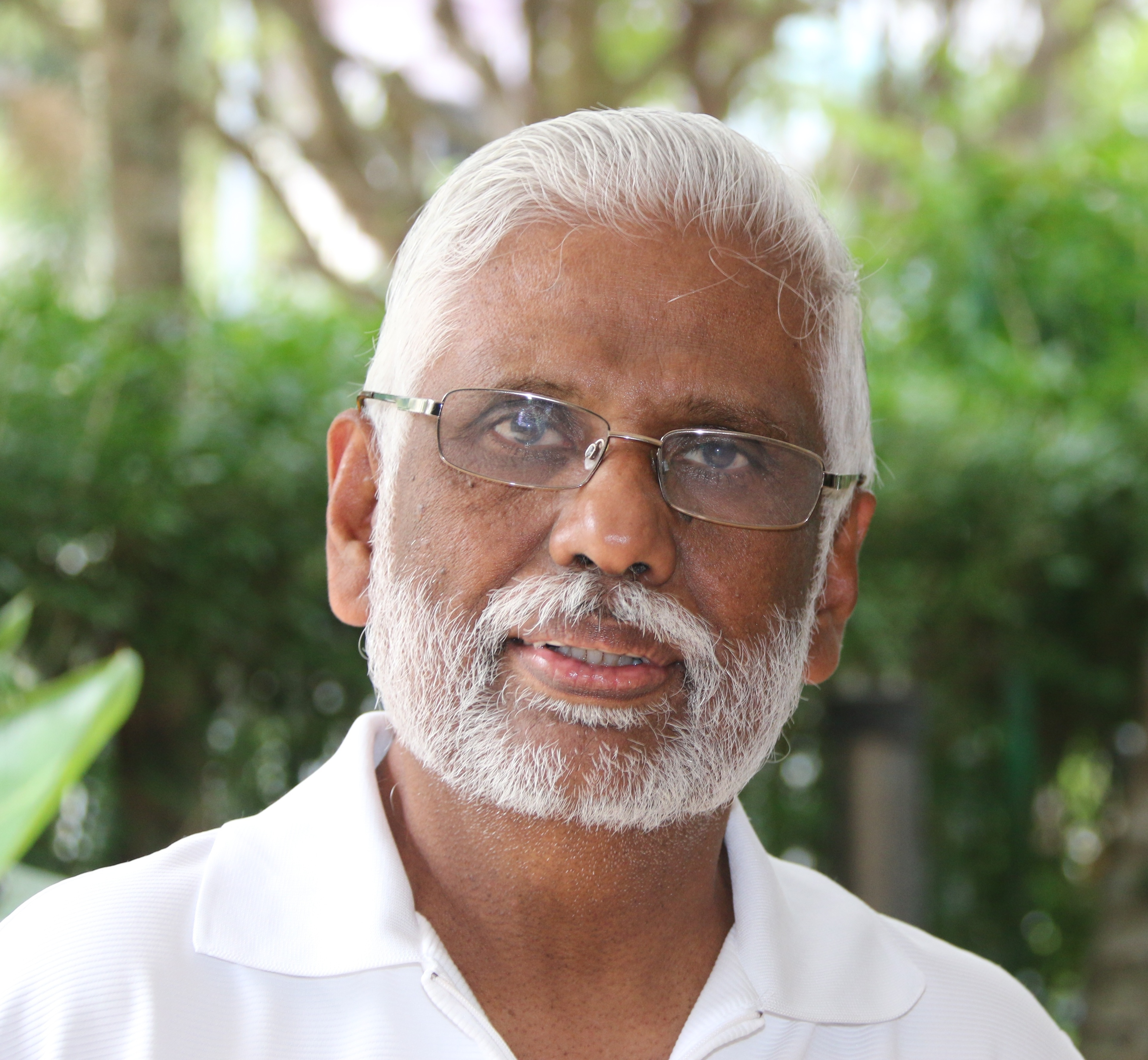
- Born: 1 February 1949 (age 77); Rameswaram, Tamil Nadu, India
- Education: University of Madurai, University of Pittsburgh
- Spouse: Vasantha (m. 1976)
- Children: 1
- Parents: Subramania Pillai; Nambu Lakshmi

Baskaran Pillai (born 1 February 1949), also known as Dattatreya Siva Baba or Siva Baba, is an Indian-born American scholar, spiritual teacher, entrepreneur and philanthropist. He is a named inventor on multiple international patent applications relating to anti-cancer small molecules. His work has included comparative religion and Tamil Siddha traditions, education and philanthropy, biotechnology, technology development and artificial-intelligence research.

Pillai studied English literature and comparative literature in India before undertaking doctoral study at the University of Pittsburgh, where his work focused on religion and South Indian intellectual and spiritual traditions. He later founded educational, charitable and research organisations in the United States and India.

His spiritual teaching became known internationally during the growth of online video. Time profiled him in 2008 as "The YouTube Guru", while SFGATE reported on his spiritual work and his association with author Wayne Dyer.

In later years, Pillai expanded his activities into scientific research, biotechnology and technology. His work has included anti-cancer small-molecule patent applications and haptic and biosensing technology.

In 2026, Pillai introduced Tamil AI, an artificial-intelligence initiative aimed at using modern AI methods to investigate classical Tamil literature, linguistic traditions and digitised historical knowledge. The initiative includes Perarivu.ai, an online platform providing Tamil-language AI resources and tools for researchers, students and the public.

== Early life and education ==
Baskaran Pillai was born on 1 February 1949 in Rameswaram, Tamil Nadu, an island in southern India between the Indian mainland and Sri Lanka. His father, Subramania Pillai, was a painter and photographer who operated a small business serving pilgrims visiting Rameswaram. His mother, Nambu Lakshmi, was the daughter of a village head in Rameswaram. Pillai grew up with four brothers.

Pillai attended a government school in Rameswaram and later a government college in Ramanathapuram. He studied English literature at the University of Madurai, receiving bachelor's and master's degrees. He subsequently undertook research in comparative literature and received a Master of Letters degree in 1982. His thesis compared the poetry of John Donne with that of the Tamil poet Kalladanar.

In 1983, Pillai moved to the United States to pursue doctoral studies at the University of Pittsburgh. His graduate research concerned the phenomenology of religion and included work on Manikkavacakar, a South Indian Tamil poet and religious figure. He received a PhD in Religious Studies from the University of Pittsburgh.

Pillai married Vasantha in 1976. They have one daughter.

== Academic and spiritual work ==
Pillai's early spiritual studies included involvement with the Transcendental Meditation movement and study under Maharishi Mahesh Yogi. In a 2008 interview with SFGATE, Pillai said that he had studied under Maharishi Mahesh Yogi during his early years and subsequently studied other Indian spiritual traditions.

While studying at the University of Pittsburgh, Pillai taught courses through the university's informal education programme and lectured on Hinduism, Buddhism, meditation and world religions. He later served as Coordinator of Indian Studies associated with the university's Asian and international studies programmes.

After completing his doctoral studies, Pillai moved away from an academic career and increasingly concentrated on spiritual teaching. From 1989 onward, he travelled internationally teaching meditation and spirituality. In 1990, he moved for a period to Los Angeles, where he conducted meditation seminars.

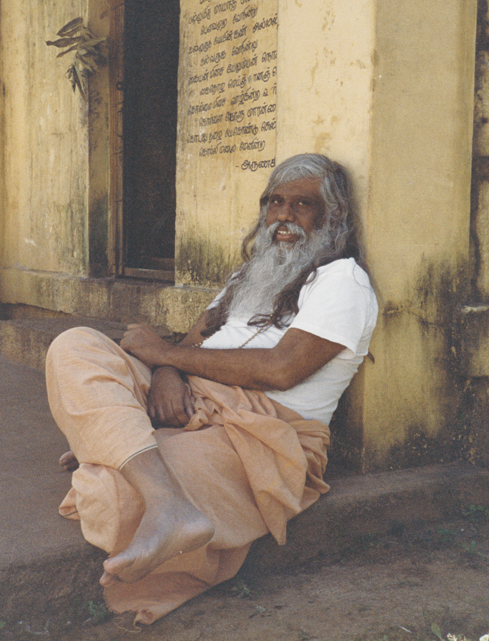
Pillai in India, 2000

During the 1990s and 2000s, Pillai taught under several spiritual names, including Sri Guruji, Brzee, Sri Siva, Siva Baba and Dattatreya Siva Baba. SFGATE identified his given name as Baskaran Pillai and reported on his work under the name Dattatreya Siva Baba.

Pillai's teachings became associated with author Wayne Dyer, who referred to him as "Guruji". In Manifest Your Destiny, Dyer described receiving teachings on manifestation from Guruji, practising the techniques in his own meditations and subsequently incorporating aspects of them into his work. Dyer dedicated the book to Guruji. SFGATE subsequently described Pillai as a guru to Dyer.

Dyer later discussed Guruji and the influence of these teachings in his autobiographical book I Can See Clearly Now.

== Publications and media ==
Pillai has published books on spirituality and meditation, including Life Changing Sounds: Tools from the Other Side and The One Minute Guide to Prosperity and Enlightenment.

He also developed an extensive online-video presence. In 2008, SFGATE reported that he had become known to followers as the "YouTube Guru" because of his frequent online videos concerning meditation, spirituality and other subjects. Time subsequently included Pillai in its 2008 feature "The YouTube Guru".

Pillai appeared briefly in the 1997 Italian science-fiction film Nirvana, starring Christopher Lambert.

== Philanthropy and education ==
Pillai founded the nonprofit Tripura Foundation, which has undertaken educational and humanitarian programmes, particularly for children and economically disadvantaged communities. The organisation has operated programmes in India, the United States and Mexico.

In India, Tripura Foundation developed HoPE Learning Centres providing educational and community support to children. In 2014, The Hindu reported on the foundation's HoPE Learning Centre programme and its work with underprivileged children.

The foundation's programmes have combined education, nutrition and community assistance. Its educational activities have also incorporated a sound-based practice developed by Pillai and referred to by the organisation as Phonemic Intelligence.

== Scientific and biotechnology work ==
Pillai later expanded his activities into scientific and biotechnology research. He established an organisation known as the East West Integrative Research Institute to investigate subjects including traditional Indian medicine and Siddha and Ayurvedic materials.

His biotechnology activities subsequently included work connected with Vopec Pharmaceuticals and Agastiya Biotech on pharmaceutical research and cancer-drug development.

Pillai is a named inventor on a series of international patent applications concerning small molecules intended for potential use in cancer treatment. An earlier PCT application, published in 2021 as WO 2021/245499, concerns small molecules for targeted degradation of KRAS in cancer therapy.

Additional international applications published in 2025 concern small-molecule inhibitors for metastatic cancer, molecular degraders, phenotype- and genotype-targeted inhibitors, protein kinase inhibitors and other small-molecule agents investigated for cancer treatment.

A drug-development programme associated with this work subsequently received Orphan Drug Designation from the U.S. Food and Drug Administration for several cancer indications in 2022.

The investigational cancer therapy subsequently entered a Phase I clinical study in India, registered with the Clinical Trials Registry - India. Further clinical development was authorised by India's Central Drugs Standard Control Organisation.

Pillai has also promoted research into Phonemic Intelligence, a concept based on his view that particular sounds or phonemes may affect cognition. Research projects involving neuroimaging and related methods have been undertaken to investigate aspects of the practice.

== Artificial intelligence and technology ==
In 2026, Pillai introduced Tamil AI, a research initiative applying artificial intelligence to classical Tamil texts and linguistic traditions. Reporting on the launch, Commonwealth Union described the project as an effort to use AI to explore and retrieve knowledge contained in Tamil literary and grammatical sources.

The project includes Perarivu.ai, a digital platform intended to make Tamil-language materials and artificial-intelligence tools available to researchers, students and the public. Pillai has cited classical works including the Tolkāppiyam, Nannūl and Tirukkuṟaḷ as source material for the initiative. The project also includes efforts with Tamil scholars to digitise and examine palm-leaf manuscripts and other historical documents.

Pillai has described the initiative as part of a broader investigation into language, knowledge and artificial intelligence. He has proposed that patterns within classical Tamil phonetics and literature may contain information relevant to contemporary knowledge systems and AI, and has described related research as "Phonemic Intelligence".

Pillai's technology work has also included haptic and biosensing systems. He is a named inventor on U.S. Patent 10,909,820, Haptic and biosensing hand mat, granted in 2021. The patented system incorporates independently controlled haptic vibrators, biometric sensors and computer control.

== International activities ==
Pillai has travelled internationally as a spiritual teacher and speaker. His activities have included lectures, seminars and conferences addressing spirituality, meditation and the relationship between religious and scientific approaches.

In 2008, Pillai participated in events in the United States associated with his "Grace Light" teachings, including a ceremony at Grace Cathedral, San Francisco. SFGATE reported that the event was part of a series of ceremonies planned in multiple cities.

Pillai has also participated in international forums, including the World Religions Forum in Buenos Aires, Argentina, and the World Knowledge Forum in Seoul, South Korea.
