= Kungar =

Village of Goyat Origin In Haryana

- Village
- Location within Haryana Location within India
- Coordinates: 29°0′22″N 76°6′1″E
- Country: India
- State: Haryana
- District: Bhiwani district

Kungar is a village in the Bhiwani district of the Indian state of Haryana. It lies approximately 22 kilometres (14 mi) north of the district headquarters town of Bhiwani. As of the 2011 Census of India, the village had 1,902 households with a population of 9,846 of which 5,292 were male and 4,554 were female. Kungar is in two divisions: Chota Pana and Bada Pana.

The languages used by villagers are Haryanvi, Hindi, and English. A branch of the State Bank of India is in Kungar.For political representational purposes the village is part of Bawani Khera Assembly constituency and the Bhiwani-Mahendragarh Lok Sabha constituency.

== Schools ==
The seven schools are:

- Hindu Middle School
- Govt.Primary School
- Bachpan Kid school
- Bhaght Senior Secondary School
- Govt. High School (for Boys)
- Govt. High School (For Girls)
- Majir Nafe Singh Kungeriya Vidya Vihar School and College

== Notables ==
- Thekedar Rajesh Goyat (Wine and Liquor Contractor)
- Jaswant Goyat (Indian Army Kargil War)
- Subhash Goyat (Farmer) Son Of Bharat Singh Goyat
- Ashish Goyat (Fighter Pilot Indian Airforce)
- Vivek Goyat (Airman Indian Airforce) Son of Jaswant Goyat
- Amit Goyat (Thekedar kungar) Son of Thekedar Rajesh Goyat
- Balvinder Goyat(Haryana Roadways Conductor
- Sonu Goyat s/o Sh. Baru Ram (Goyat Digital Studio Kungar)
- Ankul Goyat son of Nanhar goyat (Famous In Yamunanagar Industry)
- Arjun bull all india national chaimpion ownar pawan kumar

== History ==
Kungar was famous for grape cultivation until the flood of 1995 destroyed the orchard by Increasing level of ground water.

== Economy ==
The economy depends on agriculture, and animal husbandry.

The primary crops are rice, wheat, sugarcane, cotton, and fruit, particularly guava. The primary livestock animal is Murra buffalo. The Murrah bull 'Arjun' was declared the winner in its category during the 8th National Livestock Championship.

In Bawani Khera tehsil Kungar had the most tractors, rice harvesters, wheat harvesters and other agriculture equipment. All goyat comes from this village.
