= 2017 Pro Kabaddi League =

5th Season of Pro Kabaddi League

Vivo Pro Kabaddi – July 2017 Season 5
- Le panga

Tournament information
- Dates: 28 July 2017–28 October 2017
- Administrator: Mashal Sports
- Tournament format(s): Double round robin and playoffs
- Host: India
- Teams: 12
- Website: prokabaddi.com

Final positions
- Champion: Patna Pirates (3rd title)
- Runner-up: Gujarat Fortunegiants

Tournament statistics
- Matches played: 138
- Most raid points: (India) Pardeep Narwal (369)
- Most tackle points: (India) Surender Nada (80)
- Most successful raid: (India) Pardeep Narwal (271)

The 2017 Vivo Pro Kabaddi League season was the fifth season of Pro Kabaddi League, a professional kabaddi league in India since 2014. It is organised by Mashal Sports and Star India. This season includes 12 teams after the inclusion of four new teams: UP Yoddha, Tamil Thalaivas, Haryana Steelers and Gujarat Fortunegiants.

== Auction ==
Auctions for the new season were held in May, before which the existing teams were allowed to retain one player each. The auction saw over 400 players go under the hammer and a total of Rs 46.99 crore spent by the 12 teams.

The most expensive pick of the auction was raider Nitin Tomar, who was bought by the new UP franchise for a sum of Rs 93 lakh. Following in second place was Rohit Kumar after the Bengaluru Bulls picked him for a Rs 81 lakh price. The most expensive foreign player was South Korea's Jang Kun Lee after he was retained by the Bengal Warriors for Rs 80.3 lakhs.

== Opening ceremony ==
The opening ceremony is held on the first match of every leg in each stadium. This is similar to that of IPL 2017. It is done so to highlight the importance of the tradition and culture all over the country.

== Teams ==
=== Stadiums and locations ===
Team	Colors	City	Stadium	Capacity
Bengal Warriorz		Kolkata, West Bengal	Netaji Indoor Stadium, Kolkata	15,000
Bengaluru Bulls		Bengaluru, Karnataka	Kanteerava Indoor Stadium, Bangalore	4,200
Dabang Delhi KC		New Delhi, Delhi	Thyagaraj Sports Complex, Delhi	4,494
Gujarat Giants		Ahmedabad, Gujarat	EKA Arena, Amdavad	4,000
Haryana Steelers		Panchkula, Haryana	Sports University of Haryana Stadium, Sonipat	2,000
Jaipur Pink Panthers		Jaipur, Rajasthan	Sawai Mansingh Indoor Stadium, Jaipur	2,000
Patna Pirates		Patna, Bihar	Patliputra Sports Complex, Patna	3,500
Puneri Paltan		Pune, Maharashtra	Shree Shiv Chhatrapati Sports Complex, Pune	4,200
Tamil Thalaivas		Chennai, Tamil Nadu	Jawaharlal Nehru Indoor Stadium, Chennai	5,000
Telugu Titans		Hyderabad, Telangana	G. M. C. Balayogi Indoor Stadium, Hyderabad	5,000
Telugu Titans		Visakhapatnam, Andhra Pradesh	Rajiv Gandhi Indoor Stadium, Visakhapatnam	10,000
UP Yoddhas		Lucknow, Uttar Pradesh	Babu Banarasi Das Indoor Stadium, Lucknow	5,000
U Mumba		Mumbai, Maharashtra	Sardar Vallabhbhai Patel Indoor Stadium, Mumbai	8,000

=== Personnel & kit ===
Teams	Owners	Captain	Head coach	Main Sponsor	Back Sponsor
Bengal Warriors	Birthright Games & Entertainment Private Limited	Surjeet Singh	Jagdish Kumble		
Bengaluru Bulls	WL League Pvt. Ltd.	Rohit Kumar	Randhir Singh	-	
Dabang Delhi KC	Mrs Radha Kapoor Khanna	Meraj Sheykh	Dr. Ramesh Bhendigiri	ISDI	ISME
Jaipur Pink Panthers	Abhishek Bachchan	Manjeet Chillar	Balwan Singh	Finolex Cables	Lux Cozi
Patna Pirates	Rajesh V. Shah	Pardeep Narwal	Ram Meher Singh	Birla Gold Premium Cement	Johnson
Puneri Paltan	Insurekot Sports	Deepak Niwas Hooda	BC Ramesh	Force Motors	
Telugu Titans	Veera Sports	Rahul Chaudhari	Naveen Kumar	Greenko	TVS Tyres
U Mumba	Ronnie Screwvala	Anup Kumar	Bhaskaran Edacherry		
Tamil Thalaivas	Iquest Enterprises Pvt. Ltd. & Blasters Sports Ventures Pvt. Ltd.	Ajay Thakur	K Baskaran	Muthoot Fincorp India	Maha Cement
Gujarat Fortune Giants	Mr. Gautam Adani	Fazel Atrachali	Manpreet Singh	Adani	Simpolo Tiles and Bathware
Haryana Steelers	JSW Group	Surender Nada	Rambir Singh Khokhar	Kent RO	
UP Yoddha	GMR League Games Pvt. Ltd.	Nitin Tomar	J. Udaya Kumar	Tata Yodha	Karbonn

== Sponsorship ==
- Vivo
- TVS
- Bajaj
- Mutual Funds Sahi hai!
- Gillette Mach3 Turbo
- Nissin
- Royal Challenge Sports Drink
- RR Kabel

== Rules and regulations ==
The 12 teams are divided into two zones of six each. Each team plays a total of 22 matches in the league stage:

1. Teams from the same zone play each other thrice, totalling 15 matches in the zone.

2. Then, a team will play an additional of 6 matches with the teams from the other zone. (Each team plays other team from the other zone once). These 6 inter-zone matches for each team will be held on three different weeks. These weeks are known as inter-zone challenge weeks and the respective weeks are:

- 1st: 15 August – 20 August
- 2nd: 5 September – 10 September
- 3rd: 26 September – 1 October

3. Then, each team plays one wild card match which is an additional inter-zone match in the penultimate week, selected by a random mid-season draw, totalling 22 matches in the league stage.

The top three teams from each zone qualify for the super playoffs and compete for the title.

== Points table ==
The teams are divided into two zones with each zone having six teams based on their geographical proximity. Each team will play 15 intra-zonal matches and 7 inter-zonal matches.
Zone A

Team	Pld	W	L	D	SD	Pts
Gujarat Fortune Giants (R)	22	15	4	3	126	87
Puneri Paltan	22	15	7	0	91	80
Haryana Steelers	22	13	5	4	40	79
U Mumba	22	10	12	0	-50	56
Jaipur Pink Panthers	22	8	13	1	-91	51
Dabang Delhi KC	22	5	16	1	-134	29

Zone B

Team	Pld	W	L	D	SD	Pts
Bengal Warriors	22	11	5	6	19	77
Patna Pirates (C)	22	10	7	5	60	71
UP Yoddha	22	8	10	4	2	60
Bengaluru Bulls	22	8	11	3	10	57
Telugu Titans	22	7	12	3	-2	52
Tamil Thalaivas	22	6	14	2	-71	46

Source: ProKabaddi

- advanced to Qualifier 1
- advanced to Eliminators
- Five points for a win
- Three points each for a drawn game
- One point for a loss by 7 points or fewer

== League stage ==
Source:prokabaddi.com

=== Leg 1 – Gachibowli Indoor Stadium, Hyderabad ===
Match 1
28 July 2017
20:00

Telugu Titans (W)	32 – 27	Tamil Thalaivas

Match 2
28 July 2017
21:00

U Mumba	21 – 33	Puneri Paltan (W)

Match 3
29 July 2017
20:00

Jaipur Pink Panthers	26 – 30	Dabang Delhi (W)

Match 4
29 July 2017
21:00

Telugu Titans	29 – 35	Patna Pirates (W)

Match 5
30 July 2017
20:00

U Mumba (W)	29 – 28	Haryana Steelers

Match 6
30 July 2017
21:00

Telugu Titans	21 – 31	Bengaluru Bulls (W)

Match 7
1 August 2017
20:00

Gujarat Fortune Giants (W)	26 – 20	Dabang Delhi

Match 8
1 August 2017
21:00

Telugu Titans	18 – 31	UP Yoddha (W)

Match 9
2 August 2017
20:00

Gujarat Fortune Giants	27 – 27	Haryana Steelers

Match Tied

Match 10
2 August 2017
21:00

Telugu Titans	24 – 30	Bengal Warriors (W)

Match 11
3 August 2017
20:00

Telugu Titans	36 – 43	Patna Pirates (W)

=== Leg 2 – Mankapur Indoor Stadium, Nagpur ===
Match 12
4 August 2017
20:00

Bengaluru Bulls (W)	32 – 31	Tamil Thalaivas

Match 13
4 August 2017
21:00

Puneri Paltan (W)	26 – 21	Dabang Delhi
	tie

Match 14
5 August 2017
20:00

U Mumba (W)	36 – 22	Dabang Delhi

Match 15
5 August 2017
21:00

Bengaluru Bulls	27 – 32	UP Yoddha (W)

Match 16
6 August 2017
20:00

Bengal Warriors (W)	40 – 20	UP Yoddha

Match 17
6 August 2017
21:00

Bengaluru Bulls	32 – 46	Patna Pirates (W)

Match 18
8 August 2017
20:00

Gujarat Fortune Giants	20 – 32	Haryana Steelers (W)

Match 19
8 August 2017
21:00

Bengaluru Bulls	21 – 21	Telugu Titans

Match Tied

Match 20
9 August 2017
20:00

Bengaluru Bulls (W)	31 – 25	Bengal Warriors

Match 21
10 August 2017
20:00

Puneri Paltan	28 – 30	Jaipur Pink Panthers (W)

Match 22
10 August 2017
21:00

Bengaluru Bulls	24 – 29	Tamil Thalaivas (W)

=== Leg 3 – The Arena, Ahmedabad ===
Match 23
11 August 2017
20:00

Gujarat Fortune Giants (W)	39 – 21	U Mumba

Match 24
12 August 2017
20:00

Telugu Titans	32 – 39	UP Yoddha (W)

Match 25
12 August 2017
21:00

Gujarat Fortune Giants (W)	29 – 25	Dabang Delhi

Match 26
13 August 2017
20:00

Patna Pirates	27 – 27	UP Yoddha

Match Tied

Match 27
13 August 2017
21:00

Gujarat Fortune Giants (W)	27 – 20	Jaipur Pink Panthers

Match 28
Inter Zone Challenge Week
15 August 2017
20:00

Bengal Warriors	17 – 34	Puneri Paltan (W)

Match 29
Inter Zone Challenge Week
15 August 2017
21:00

Gujarat Fortune Giants (W)	27 – 24	Bengaluru Bulls

Match 30
Inter Zone Challenge Week
16 August 2017
20:00

Haryana Steelers	25 – 25	Tamil Thalaivas

Match Tied

Match 31
Inter Zone Challenge Week
16 August 2017
21:00

Gujarat Fortune Giants (W)	29 – 19	Telugu Titans

Match 32
Inter Zone Challenge Week
17 August 2017
20:00

Dabang Delhi (W)	30 – 29	Tamil Thalaivas

Match 33
Inter Zone Challenge Week
17 August 2017
21:00

Gujarat Fortune Giants	26 – 26	Bengal Warriors

Match Tied

=== Leg 4 – Babu Banarasi Das Indoor Stadium, Lucknow ===
Match 34
Inter Zone Challenge Week
18 August 2017
20:00

UP Yoddha	34 – 37	U Mumba (W)

Match 35
Inter Zone Challenge Week
18 August 2017
21:00

Bengaluru Bulls	28 – 30	Jaipur Pink Panthers (W)

Match 36
Inter Zone Challenge Week
19 August 2017
20:00

Telugu Titans (W)	37 – 32	U Mumba

Match 37
Inter Zone Challenge Week
19 August 2017
21:00

UP Yoddha	29 – 36	Haryana Steelers (W)

Match 38
Inter Zone Challenge Week
20 August 2017
20:00

Patna Pirates	42 – 47	Puneri Paltan (W)

Match 39
Inter Zone Challenge Week
20 August 2017
21:00

UP Yoddha	22 – 24	Jaipur Pink Panthers (W)

Match 40
22 August 2017
20:00

Gujarat Fortune Giants (W)	35 – 21	Puneri Paltan

Match 41
22 August 2017
21:00

UP Yoddha	31 – 32	Bengal Warriors (W)

Match 42
23 August 2017
20:00

Haryana Steelers (W)	27 – 25	Dabang Delhi

Match 43
23 August 2017
21:00

UP Yoddha	33 – 33	Tamil Thalaivas

Match Tied

Match 44
24 August 2017
20:00

UP Yoddha (W)	25 – 23	Telugu Titans

=== Leg 5 – Dome@NSCI SVP Stadium, Mumbai ===
Match 45
25 August 2017
20:00

U Mumba	36 – 39	Jaipur Pink Panthers (W)

Match 46
25 August 2017
21:00

Bengal Warriors	36 – 36	Patna Pirates

Match Tied

Match 47
26 August 2017
20:00

Patna Pirates (W)	35 – 24	Tamil Thalaivas

Match 48
26 August 2017
21:00

U Mumba	24 – 26	Puneri Paltan (W)

Match 49
27 August 2017
20:00

Bengal Warriors (W)	32 – 26	Bengaluru Bulls

Match 50
27 August 2017
21:00

U Mumba	32 – 33	Dabang Delhi (W)

Match 51
29 August 2017
20:00

Bengaluru Bulls	–	UP Yoddha

Match postponed to 17 October 2017, 20:00

Match 52
29 August 2017
21:00

U Mumba	–	Gujarat Fortune Giants

Match postponed to 20 September 2017, 20:00

Match 53
30 August 2017
20:00

U Mumba (W)	38 – 32	Haryana Steelers

Match 54
31 August 2017
20:00

Telugu Titans (W)	33 – 28	Tamil Thalaivas

Match 55
31 August 2017
21:00

U Mumba (W)	36 – 32	Jaipur Pink Panthers

=== Leg 6 – Netaji Subhas Chandra Bose Stadium, Kolkata ===
Match 56
1 September 2017
20:00

Bengal Warriors (W)	41 – 38	Patna Pirates

Match 57
2 September 2017
20:00

Gujarat Fortune Giants	36 – 42	Haryana Steelers (W)

Match 58
2 September 2017
21:00

Bengal Warriors	26 – 26	UP Yoddha

Match Tied

Match 59
3 September 2017
20:00

Gujarat Fortune Giants	25 – 31	Jaipur Pink Panthers (W)

Match 60
3 September 2017
21:00

Bengal Warriors (W)	29 – 25	Tamil Thalaivas

Match 61
Inter Zone Challenge Week
5 September 2017
20:00

Patna Pirates (W)	47 – 20	Jaipur Pink Panthers

Match 62
Inter Zone Challenge Week
5 September 2017
21:00

Bengal Warriors	29 – 36	Haryana Steelers (W)

Match 63
Inter Zone Challenge Week
6 September 2017
20:00

Dabang Delhi (W)	38 – 30	Bengaluru Bulls

Match 64
Inter Zone Challenge Week
6 September 2017
21:00

Bengal Warriors	31 – 37	U Mumba (W)

Match 65
Inter Zone Challenge Week
7 September 2017
20:00

Telugu Titans	37 – 42	Puneri Paltan (W)

Match 66
Inter Zone Challenge Week
7 September 2017
21:00

Bengal Warriors	31 – 31	Dabang Delhi

Match Tied

=== Leg 7 – Motilal Nehru School of Sports, Sonepat ===
Match 67
Inter Zone Challenge Week
8 September 2017
20:00

Haryana Steelers	41 –41	Patna Pirates

Match Tied

Match 68
Inter Zone Challenge Week
8 September 2017
21:00

Gujarat Fortune Giants	30 – 30	UP Yoddha

Match Tied

Match 69
Inter Zone Challenge Week
9 September 2017
20:00

Patna Pirates	41 – 51	U Mumba (W)

Match 70
Inter Zone Challenge Week
9 September 2017
21:00

Haryana Steelers (W)	38 – 31	Bengaluru Bulls

Match 71
Inter Zone Challenge Week
10 September 2017
20:00

Bengaluru Bulls (W)	24 – 20	Puneri Paltan

Match 72
Inter Zone Challenge Week
10 September 2017
21:00

Haryana Steelers	19 – 37	Telugu Titans (W)

Match 73
12 September 2017
20:00

Bengal Warriors (W)	32 – 31	Telugu Titans

Match 74
12 September 2017
21:00

Haryana Steelers (W)	27 – 24	Dabang Delhi

Match 75
13 September 2017
20:00

Tamil Thalaivas (W)	34 – 33	UP Yoddha

Match 76
13 September 2017
21:00

Haryana Steelers	22 – 38	Puneri Paltan (W)

Match 77
14 September 2017
20:00

Haryana Steelers	27 – 27	Jaipur Pink Panthers

Match Tied

=== Leg 8 – Harivansh Tana Bhagat Indoor Stadium, Ranchi ===
Match 78
15 September 2017
20:00

Patna Pirates (W)	46 – 30	Telugu Titans

Match 79
15 September 2017
21:00

U Mumba	28 – 39	Gujarat Fortune Giants (W)

Match 80
16 September 2017
20:00

Bengaluru Bulls	26 – 26	Telugu Titans

Match Tied

Match 81
16 September 2017
21:00

Patna Pirates (W)	45 – 42	UP Yoddha

Match 82
17 September 2017
20:00

Jaipur Pink Panthers (W)	36 – 25	Dabang Delhi

Match 83
17 September 2017
21:00

Patna Pirates	37 – 37	Bengal Warriors

Match Tied

Match 84
19 September 2017
20:00

Puneri Paltan (W)	37 – 25	Haryana Steelers

Match 85
19 September 2017
21:00

Patna Pirates (W)	36 – 32	Bengaluru Bulls

Match 52
20 September 2017
20:00

U Mumba	23 – 45	Gujarat Fortune Giants (W)

Match postponed from 29 August

Match 86
20 September 2017
21:00

Patna Pirates (W)	41 – 39	Tamil Thalaivas

Match 87
21 September 2017
20:00

Jaipur Pink Panthers	26 – 30	Haryana Steelers (W)

Match 88
21 September 2017
21:00

Patna Pirates	41 – 46	UP Yoddha (W)

=== Leg 9 – Thyagaraj Sports Complex, New Delhi ===
Match 89
22 September 2017
20:00

Dabang Delhi	28 – 30	U Mumba (W)

Match 90
23 September 2017
20:00

Bengaluru Bulls	29 – 33	Bengal Warriors (W)

Match 91
23 September 2017
21:00

Dabang Delhi	29 – 34	Puneri Paltan (W)

Match 92
24 September 2017
20:00

Bengal Warriors	32 – 33	Tamil Thalaivas (W)

Match 93
24 September 2017
21:00

Dabang Delhi	24 – 42	Haryana Steelers (W)

Match 94
Inter Zone Challenge Week
26 September 2017
20:00

Gujarat Fortune Giants	34 – 35	Tamil Thalaivas (W)

Match 95
Inter Zone Challenge Week
26 September 2017
21:00

Dabang Delhi	34 – 36	Patna Pirates (W)

Match 96
Inter Zone Challenge Week
27 September 2017
20:00

Telugu Titans (W)	41 – 34	Jaipur Pink Panthers

Match 97
Inter Zone Challenge Week
27 September 2017
21:00

Dabang Delhi	16 – 45	UP Yoddha (W)

Match 98
Inter Zone Challenge Week
28 September 2017
20:00

Bengaluru Bulls	30 – 42	U Mumba (W)

Match 99
Inter Zone Challenge Week
28 September 2017
21:00

Dabang Delhi	22 – 44	Telugu Titans (W)

=== Leg 10 – Jawaharlal Nehru Indoor Stadium, Chennai ===
Match 100
Inter Zone Challenge Week
29 September 2017
20:00

Tamil Thalaivas	20 – 33	Puneri Paltan (W)

Match 101
Inter Zone Challenge Week
29 September 2017
21:00

Gujarat Fortune Giants (W)	30 – 29	Patna Pirates

Match 102
Inter Zone Challenge Week
30 September 2017
20:00

Puneri Paltan (W)	34 – 33	UP Yoddha

Match 103
Inter Zone Challenge Week
30 September 2017
21:00

Tamil Thalaivas	26 – 27	Jaipur Pink Panthers (W)

Match 104
Inter Zone Challenge Week
1 October 2017
20:00

Jaipur Pink Panthers	31-32	Bengal Warriors (W)

Match 105
Inter Zone Challenge Week
1 October 2017
21:00

Tamil Thalaivas	30–33	U Mumba (W)

Match 106
3 October 2017
20:00

Dabang Delhi	22 – 42	Gujarat Fortune Giants (W)

Match 107
3 October 2017
21:00

Tamil Thalaivas	37 – 58	Telugu Titans (W)

Match 108
4 October 2017
20:00

U Mumba	30 – 41	Haryana Steelers (W)

Match 109
4 October 2017
21:00

Tamil Thalaivas	33 – 37	UP Yoddha (W)

Match 110
5 October 2017
20:00

Tamil Thalaivas	35 – 45	Bengaluru Bulls (W)

=== Leg 11 – Sawai Mansingh Indoor Stadium, Jaipur ===
Match 111
6 October 2017
20:00

Jaipur Pink Panthers	23 - 29	Gujarat Fortune Giants (W)

Match 112
Inter Zone Wildcard Match
6 October 2017
21:00

Puneri Paltan	19 - 25	Bengal Warriors (W)

Match 113
Inter Zone Wildcard Match
7 October 2017
20:00

Haryana Steelers (W)	32 – 30	Telugu Titans

Match 114
7 October 2017
21:00

Jaipur Pink Panthers (W)	36 – 32	U Mumba

Match 115
Inter Zone Wildcard Match
8 October 2017
20:00

Gujarat Fortune Giants (W)	33 – 29	Patna Pirates

Match 116
8 October 2017
21:00

Jaipur Pink Panthers	30 – 38	Puneri Paltan (W)

Match 117
Inter Zone Wildcard Match
10 October 2017
20:00

U Mumba	35 – 38	Tamil Thalaivas (W)

Match 118
10 October 2017
21:00

Jaipur Pink Panthers	34 – 35	Dabang Delhi (W)

Match 119
Inter Zone Wildcard Match
11 October 2017
20:00

Dabang Delhi	32 – 35	Bengaluru Bulls (W)

Match 120
11 October 2017
21:00

Jaipur Pink Panthers	27 – 37	Haryana Steelers (W)

Match 121
Inter Zone Wildcard Match
12 October 2017
20:00

Jaipur Pink Panthers	32 – 53	UP Yoddha (W)

=== Leg 12 – Shree Shiv Chhatrapati Sports Complex, Pune ===
Match 122
13 October 2017
20:00

Puneri Paltan	20 – 44	Gujarat Fortune Giants (W)

Match 123
13 October 2017
21:00

Bengal Warriors (W)	34 – 30	Tamil Thalaivas

Match 124
14 October 2017
20:00

Tamil Thalaivas (W)	40 – 37	Patna Pirates

Match 125
14 October 2017
21:00

Puneri Paltan (W)	43 – 24	U Mumba

Match 126
15 October 2017
20:00

Bengaluru Bulls (W)	38 – 32	UP Yoddha

Match 127
15 October 2017
21:00

Puneri Paltan (W)	34 – 31	Dabang Delhi

Match 51
17 October 2017
20:00

Bengaluru Bulls (W)	64 – 24	UP Yoddha

Match postponed from 29 August

Match 128
17 October 2017
21:00

Puneri Paltan	27 – 31	Haryana Steelers (W)

Match 129
18 October 2017
20:00

Patna Pirates	29 – 29	Bengaluru Bulls

Match 130
18 October 2017
21:00

Puneri Paltan (W)	38 – 15	Jaipur Pink Panthers

Match 131
20 October 2017
20:00

Telugu Titans	37 – 37	Bengal Warriors

Match 132
20 October 2017
21:00

Puneri Paltan	22 – 23	Gujarat Fortune Giants (W)

== Playoffs ==
=== Bracket ===
Elimination finals
A2	Puneri Paltan	40
B3	UP Yoddha	38
A3	Haryana Steelers	30
B2	Patna Pirates	69

Major/Minor semifinal
B1	Bengal Warriors	17
A1	Gujarat Giants	42
Puneri Paltan	32
Patna Pirates	42

Preliminary final
Bengal Warriors	44
Patna Pirates	47

Grand final
Gujarat Giants	38
Patna Pirates	55

=== Eliminator 1 – Dome@NSCI SVP Stadium, Mumbai ===
Match 133
23 October 2017
20:00

Puneri Paltan (W)	40 – 38	UP Yoddha

=== Eliminator 2 – Dome@NSCI SVP Stadium, Mumbai ===
Match 134
23 October 2017
21:00

Haryana Steelers	30 – 69	Patna Pirates (W)

- Pardeep Narwal scored the most raid points in a single Pro Kabaddi League match (34) and he also scored most points in a single raid (8).

=== Qualifier 1 – Sardar Vallabhbhai Patel Indoor Stadium, Mumbai ===
Match 135
24 October 2017
20:00

Gujarat Fortunegiants (W)	42 – 17	Bengal Warriors

=== Eliminator 3 – Dome@NSCI SVP Stadium, Mumbai ===
Match 136
24 October 2017
21:00

Puneri Paltan	32 – 42	Patna Pirates (W)

=== Qualifier 2 – Jawaharlal Nehru Indoor Stadium, Chennai ===
Match 137
26 October 2017
20:00

Bengal Warriors	44 - 47	Patna Pirates (W)

=== Final – Jawaharlal Nehru Indoor Stadium, Chennai ===
Match 138
28 October 2017
20:00

Gujarat Fortunegiants	38 – 55	Patna Pirates (W)

== Statistics ==
Source: prokabaddi.com

=== Most Points Overall ===
Player	Team	Matches Played	Points
Pardeep Narwal	Patna pirates	26	369
Rohit Kumar	Bengaluru Bulls	22	231
Ajay Thakur	Tamil Thalaivas	22	213

=== Most Raid Points ===
Player	Team	Matches Played	Points
Pardeep Narwal	Patna Pirates	26	369
Rohit Kumar	Bengaluru Bulls	22	219
Ajay Thakur	Tamil Thalaivas	22	213

=== Most Tackle Points ===
Player	Team	Matches Played	Points
Surender Nada	Haryana Steelers	21	80
Surjeet Singh	Bengal Warriors	24	76
Vishal Bhardwaj	Telugu Titans	22	71

=== Most Super 10s ===
Player	Team	Matches Played	Times
Pradeep Narwal	Patna Pirates	26	19
Rohit Kumar	Bengaluru Bulls	22	12
Ajay Thakur	Tamil Thalaivas	22	12

=== Most High 5s ===
Player	Team	Matches Played	Times
Surender Nada	Haryana Steelers	21	9
Surjeet S. Singh	Bengal Warriors	24	9
Girish Maruti Ernak	Puneri Paltan	21	5
