= Baska =

Baska may refer to:

Places

- Baška, Croatia, a municipality in Croatia
- Baška (Frýdek-Místek District), a municipality in the Czech Republic
- Baska, Andal, a town in India
- Baška, Košice-okolie District, a municipality in Slovakia
- Durmuşlu or Baska, a town in Turkey

Entertainment

- Baśka, a Polish card game
- Başka 33/3, an album by Işın Karaca

Surname

- Rich Baska (born 1952), American football player
