= Mallakam Sri Baskaran Cricket Ground =

Cricket stadium in Sri Lanka

Ground information
- Location: Mallakam, Jaffna District, Northern Province, Sri Lanka
- Establishment: 14 March 2021
- Owner: Jaffna Cricket Association
- Tenants: TBD after 2022 (Sri Lanka national cricket team Inter-Provincial Limited Over Tournament; Inter-Provincial Twenty20)

International information
- As of 20 March 2021

Mallakam Sri Baskaran Cricket Ground, Jaffna also known as Mallakam Cricket Ground, (Sinhala: මල්ලකම් ශ්‍රී බාස්කරන් ක්‍රිකට් ක්‍රීඩාංගණය, Tamil: மல்லகம் ஸ்ரீ பாஸ்கரன் கிரிக்கெட் மைதானம்) is a cricket stadium in Mallakam, Jaffna District, Sri Lanka. The ground was named after late philanthropist Sri Baskaran as a tribute for donating the land which was used to construct the cricket ground. The cricket ground is currently owned and managed by the Jaffna Cricket Association.

The ground was built under the initiative Cricket Gamata program which was launched by the Sri Lanka Cricket. It was revealed that renowned philanthropist Sri Baskaran donated his land on a 60-year lease agreement for the purpose of using it as a cricket ground. The cricket ground was officially declared open on 14 March 2021 with the motive of developing interest in cricket among the youth in the Jaffna peninsula.

The first phase of the ground development which was unveiled includes a matting wicket, two side practice wickets, an office room and player changing room. The cricket ground is set to be developed as a fully fledged cricket ground by the end of 2022 as a part of the 3 phase development program. The full-fledged cricket stadium is set to be established for the purpose of domestic cricket in Jaffna with a turf wicket at a cost ranging from 20 million to 25 million.

In July 2020, Sri Lanka Cricket Board announced Mallakam as one of their targets to develop and revive interest in cricket in rural areas. The Sri Lanka Army personnel also contributed for the construction of the ground.

On 14 March 2021, an exhibition T20 cricket match was also contested between two intra Jaffna based teams during the inauguration ceremony.
