= Ankush (given name) =

Ankush is a given name. Notable people with the name include:

- Ankush Hazra, Indian actor
- Ankush Arora, Indian actor and singer
- Ankush Bains (born 1995), Indian cricketer
- Ankush Chaudhari, Indian actor
- Ankushita Boro, Indian boxer
- Ankush Saikia (born 1975), Indian author
- Ankush Singh (born 1998), Indian cricketer
