= Ankush Rathee =

Indian Kabaddi player

Personal information
- Nationality: Indian
- Born: 30 June 2003 (age 23)

Sport
- Country: India
- Sport: Kabaddi
- Position: Defender, left corner
- League: Pro Kabaddi League
- Team: Jaipur Pink Panthers
Medal record
Men's Kabaddi
Representing India
Junior World Kabaddi Championship
Gold medal – first place	2nd Junior World Kabaddi Championship	2023 Urmia,(Iran)

Ankush Rathee (born 30 June 2003) is an Indian professional Kabaddi player who plays as a defender in the Pro Kabaddi League for Jaipur Pink Panthers. He was the best defender in the Pro Kabaddi League Season-9. He was part of the Indian team that won the gold medal at the 2023 2nd Junior World Kabaddi Championship, Urmia (Iran).

== Early life ==
Ankush was born in rohtak, Haryana. He started playing kabaddi in early age.

== Career ==
In Pro Kabaddi Season-8-, Ankush made his debut as a new young player in Bengaluru Bulls; However, got no playtime. In Pro Kabaddi Season-9 he was bought by Jaipur Pink Panthers. Ninth Season of Pro Kabaddi League was turning point for Ankush. He scored 89 tackle points in 24 matches. He was the best defender of 2022 Pro Kabaddi League. In February 2023, he was selected to play 2nd Junior World Kabaddi Championship, took place in Urmia, Iran. He played as captain in the championship and won the championship. he played 37th national games for the Sports Control Board at Goa in October,2023 and won the nationals. currently, Ankush is playing 2023-24 Pro Kabaddi League for Jaipur Pink Panthers.
