= Naveen Kumar (kabaddi) =

Indian kabaddi player

Personal information
- Full name: Naveen Kumar Goyat
- Nickname: Naveen Express
- Nationality: Indian
- Born: 14 February 2000 (age 26) Sultanpur, Haryana, India
- Education: Kurukshetra University
- Occupation: Kabaddi Player
- Years active: 2018–present
- Height: 5 ft 10 in (178 cm)
- Weight: 76 kg (168 lb)

Sport
- Country: India
- Sport: Kabaddi
- Position: Raider
- League: Pro Kabaddi League
- Club: Haryana Steelers (2025–present)
- Team: Indian national kabaddi team
Medal record
Men's kabaddi
Representing India
Asian Games
Gold medal – first place	2022 Hangzhou	Team
South Asian Games
Gold medal – first place	2019 Kathmandu	Team
Commonwealth Kabaddi Championship
Gold medal – first place	2026 Amdavad	Team

Naveen Kumar Goyat (born 14 February 2000) is an Indian professional kabaddi player who plays for the Indian national kabaddi team and Haryana Steelers in the Pro Kabaddi League. His speedy raiding and consistency makes him one of the best raiders in the league. He was part of the Indian Kabaddi team that won the gold medal at the 2022 Asian Games. India defeated Iran 33–29 in a controversial final.

== Early life ==
Naveen was born in Bhaini Jattan (Kungar)village in Bhiwani district, Haryana, on 14 February 2000. His father (Sansar Goyat) is a Roadways Bus driver; and he was introduced to the sport by his grandfather. He completed his education at Kurukshetra University. He is the youngest person playing in the Pro Kabaddi League.

== Pro Kabaddi League career ==
=== Season 6 ===
Naveen made his debut in 2018, Season 6 of the Pro Kabaddi League for the club Dabang Delhi. He finished the season as the team's top scorer with 177 points and helped it to the playoffs.

=== Season 7 ===
He performed consistently in Season 7 and won the Most valuable player Award (MVP). The team emerged runner-up. His performance placed him as one of the league's best raiders, scoring 300 points in a single season. He scored Super 10s (more than 10 points in a single game) in 22 of the 23 matches he played. He also got the nickname 'Naveen Express' for his speedy raids and consistency.

=== Season 8 ===
Naveen played in the first few matches of the tournament and the team won initial games. He also became the fastest player to reach 600 points in the history of the league. However, he had to walk out in the middle due to an injury. He returned in the latter stage of the tournament. Dabang Delhi won the tournament. Naveen won the Most Valuable Player Award as well.

== International career ==
Naveen Kumar plays for the Indian national kabaddi team. He was a part of the national team at the 13th South-Asian Games, where he played an important role in helping the team win the tournament. He scored a Super 10 in the final against Sri Lanka. In the Asian Kabaddi Championships 2023 in Busan, he is the key player of a team. Naveen performed well in this tournament and helped India take a gold medal. He was selected for the Asian Games 2023, which were hosted by China.
