= Ankushapur, Jayashankar Bhupalpally district =

Ankushapur
- village
- Location in Telangana, India Ankushapur (India)
- Coordinates: 18.427761°N 79.605873°E
- Country: India
- State: Telangana
- District: Jayashankar Bhupalpally
- Mandals: Tekumatla (Jayashankar Bhupalpally)

Population (2001)
  - Total: 1,089 (Ankushapur)

Languages
  - Official: Telugu
- Time zone: UTC+5:30 (IST)
- PIN: 506356
- Telephone code: 91 08713

Ankushapur is a village panchayat in Tekumatla mandal in Jayashankar Bhupalpally district in the state of Telangana in India. Located 72 km from Warangal city, The population of this village is approximately 1000. This village panchayat is a combination of two villages named as Ankushapur and Somanpalli. Ankushapur village does not have a bus route or train route. People get buses from Tekumatla which is 1 km away. from Ankushapur. From Tekumatla people has bus facility to Parkal, Warangal and Jammikunta. in this village there is no post office, roads, or mobile tower and there is also no water plant. This village has two temples one is Hanuman temple located in center of the village and another one is Baddi Pochamma temple located on the outskirts of the village. and there is a government primary school in this village. Earlier Literacy percentage of this village was very low, but now the literacy percentage is very good.

This village is largely depends on agricultural. 90% of the population depends on agriculture and related activities. Here people prefer to crop cotton, red chili, holdy and paddi (rice) agriculture. Cotton is the major crop in this village. Many thousands of quintals cotton production is produced every year. But many of the farmers depends on the monsoon for irrigation and drinking.

== Geography ==
Location in Google Maps

Approximate co-ordinates: 18° 25' 39.94", 79° 36' 21.14"

== SubCastes ==
The other SubCastes or Geographical Names of Munnuru Kapuare

- Munnuru Kapu
- Kapu

Please Refer to Kapu for more details about the Community.

== Origins ==
The name Munnuru seems to be of a recent origin, which means three hundred. The Telaga or Naidu Community and were the Imperial guard of the Tanjore Nayaks who dispatched a battalion of his best Infantry and Cavalry for the personal security on the request of the Nawab of Hyderabad The Tanjore Nayak dispatched three hundred Telaga men and their families. The descendants of these Three hundred families are now called Munnuru Kapu.

The Munnuru Kapu Community have always been associated with one Kingdom or the other in the form of Interior Palace Guards like Tanjavur Nayaks, Devarakonda, Nizam etc.

At present Day Munnuru Kapu People are more than 1 Crore people in Andhra Pradesh, Maharashtra States

== References and sources ==
Important information about Kapu origins can be obtained from Balijapuranam in the Chennai library.

- Caste and Race in India (by G.S.Ghurye)
