= Rameshwarlal Kabra =

Indian industrialist

Rameshwarlal Kabra is an industrialist from India. In 2018, he received the Padma Shri honour by the President of India, Ram Nath Kovind, for his work in rural and tribal societies.

Migrated from Bangladesh to Nepal and then back to India, Rameshwarlal Kabra started from a small electrical trading shop in Bombay. He founded RR Kabel and the group is among the market leaders in its segment.
