= Baška, Košice-okolie District =

Municipality of Slovakia

Baška Baska
- Municipality
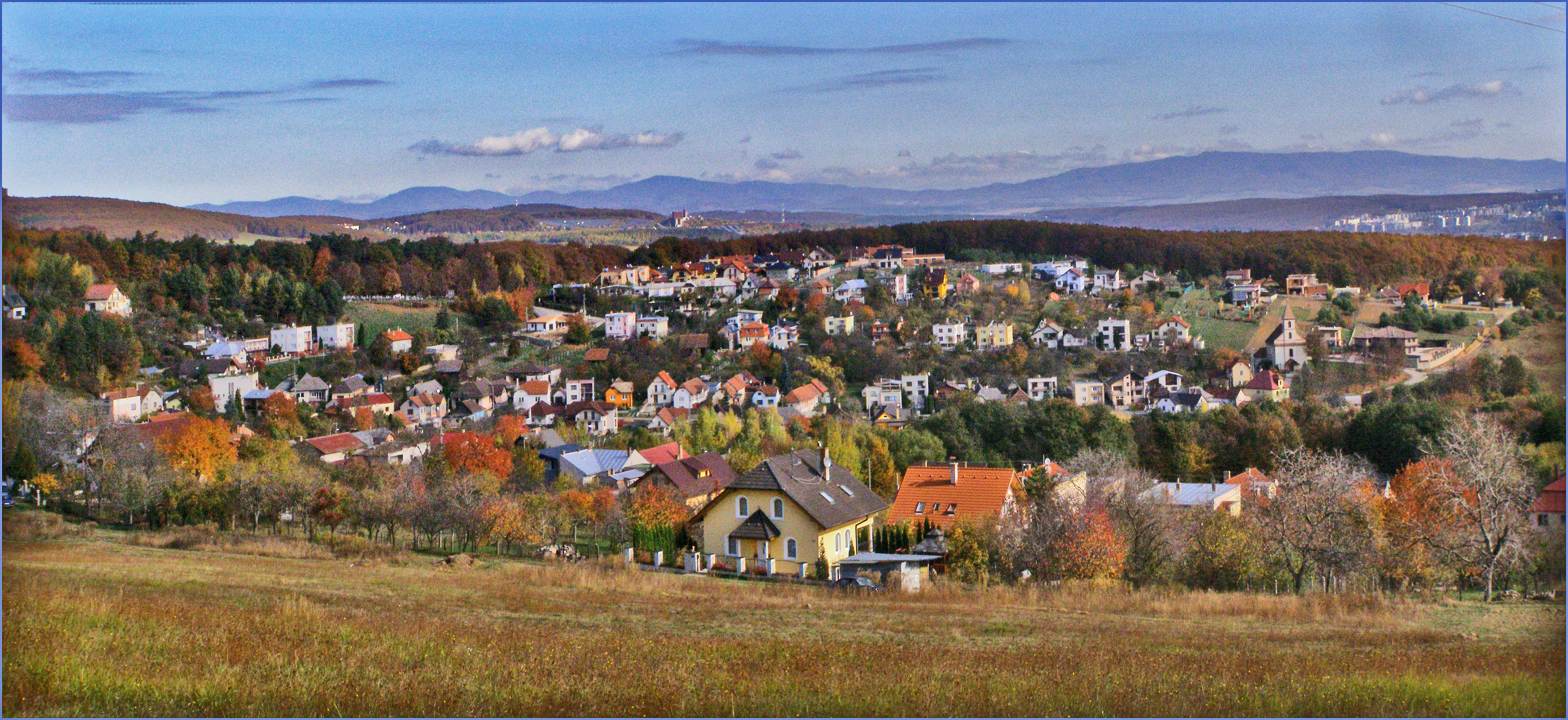

- Flag

- Location of Baška in the Košice Region Location of Baška in Slovakia
- Coordinates: 48.70°N 21.18°E
- Country: Slovakia
- Region: Košice Region
- District: Košice-okolie District
- First mentioned: 1247

Area
  - Total: 4.49 km^{2} (1.73 sq mi)
- Elevation: 366 m (1,201 ft)

Population (2025)
  - Total: 807
- Time zone: UTC+1 (CET)
  - Summer (DST): UTC+2 (CEST)
- Postal code: 442 0
- Area code: +421 55
- Vehicle registration plate (until 2022): KS
- Website: www.baska-obec.sk

Baška (1247 Terra Pousa, Bosk, Bayan, 1399 Bosk, Bask, 1427 Baask, 1612 Bosko, Boska) (German: Baumgarten, Boschko; Hungarian: Baska) is a village and municipality in the Košice-okolie District of the Kosice Region in eastern Slovakia.

== Etymology ==
The name comes from the Slavic personal name Božk, Božek or Božka (derived from bog: god), the older theory proposed by Ján Stanislav is also Bašek.

== History ==
The village was first mentioned in 1247. During this period, it belonged to the Abov (Abó) family local branch. In 1427 it belonged to the Frank family of Šemša. In 1447 the village was bought by Captain Peter from Spiš county. In 1580 it became a part of the town of Myslava, and during this period the exploitation of local wood began. From 1939 to 1944 it became part of Hungary again.

== Geography ==
The municipality lies at an altitude of 366 metres (1,201 ft) and covers an area of 4.49 km^{2} (1.73 sq mi) (2025).

== Population ==
Population statistic (10 years)
Year	1995	2005	2015	2025
Count	265	328	581	807
Difference		+23.77%	+77.13%	+38.89%

Population statistic
Year	2024	2025
Count	797	807
Difference		+1.25%

It has a population of 807 people (31 December 2025).

== Genealogical resources ==
The records for genealogical research are available at the state archive in Košice (Slovak: Štátny archív v Košiciach).

- Roman Catholic church records (births/marriages/deaths): 1788-1897 (parish B)
- Greek Catholic church records (births/marriages/deaths): 1850-1911 (parish B)

== See also ==
- List of municipalities and towns in Slovakia
