= Kasinatha Baskaran =

Indian kabaddi player and coach

Baskaran
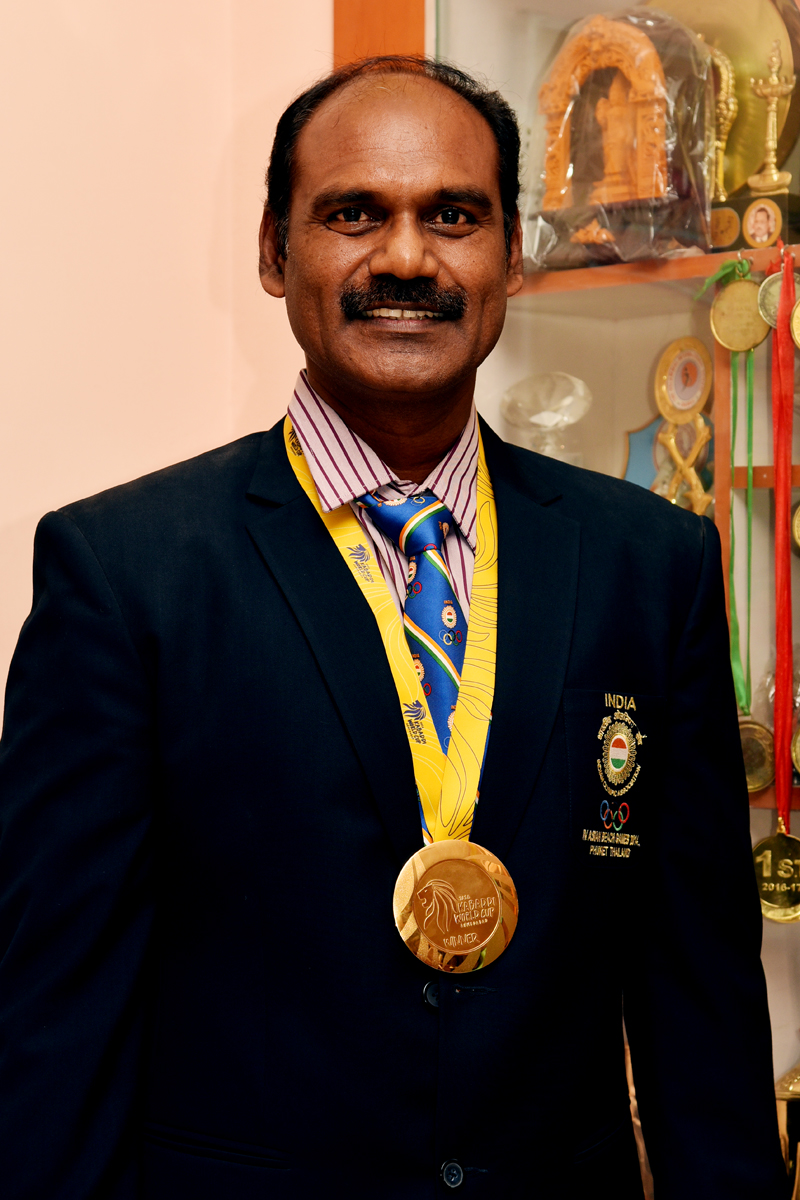
- Baskaran Wins World Cup 2016

Personal information
- Full name: Baskaran Kasinathan
- Born: 28 June 1968 (age 58) Sooliyakkottai, Thanjavur district, Madras State (now Tamil Nadu), India
- Education: U.A.A.T Hr Sec School, Ammapet
- Occupations: Coach, India national kabaddi team
- Years active: 1989–2002
- Height: 1.85 m (6 ft 1 in)
- Weight: 95 kg (209 lb)

Sport
- Country: India
- Sport: Kabaddi
- Position: All Rounder
- League: Pro Kabaddi League
- Club: Tamil Thalaivas
- Team: India national kabaddi team
- Turned pro: 1988

Achievements and titles
- Highest world ranking: World No. 1
Medal record
Representing India
Sports
Gold medal – first place	1994 Hiroshima	Team
Gold medal – first place	1995 Chennai	Team

K. Baskaran or Baskaran Kasinathan (born 28 June 1968) is a professional Indian Kabaddi sportsman who has represented Indian National Men's Kabaddi team in International games and is mentoring as a Kabaddi Coach. He has won national as well as international medals. He has been a professional coach for International teams and Kabaddi League franchises. He serves as a coach for the Indian National Men's Kabaddi team and the coach for the Pro Kabaddi franchise Bengal Warriors.

He is an active sports enthusiast and apart from being a coach he also concentrates on identifying and training young athletes.

== Personal life ==
K. Baskaran is the fourth child of Kasinathan Sittachiyar-Krishnammal couple born at Sooliyakottai, Tanjore in the Indian state of Tamil Nadu. He studied at Government School of Sooliyakottai, Ammapettai Saliyamangalam. He graduated from Madurai Kamarajar University. He earned a degree as Specialist Coach from National Institute of Sports, Bangalore.

He started playing Kabaddi at age 12. He rose to fame when he represented the National Team and gained media attention since his association with the Indian Pro Kabaddi League as a coach and as a coach in the 2016 Kabaddi World Cup.

K. Baskran is married to B. Prabha and he has three children: son B. Soorya, a discus athlete and two daughters B. Neetaa and B. Neerajaa both of whom play basketball.

== Achievements ==
Top Achievements in National and International Levels
Competition	Venue	Year	Position
Asian Games	Hiroshima, Japan	1994	Gold
Saf Games (captain)	Chennai, India	1995	Gold
Test Series (India vs Sri Lanka (captain)	Thanjavur, India	1997	First
Senior Nationals		1993–1996	3 consecutive Gold
National Games	Pune	1993	Gold
All India Kabaddi Federation Cup		1995	Gold
Senior Nationals		1996–1997	Silver
National Games		1997	Bronze
Senior Nationals		1996–1997	Bronze

== Player ==
Baskaran was coached by Mr. Swaminathan and Mr. Shanmugasundaram during his school days. He was inspired to play Kabaddi by Raja Rajendran, a Tamil Nadu Kabaddi player and an employee of TNEB. He had participated in the Republic Day Sports Meet and placed 2nd in 1984–85 and 1st in 1985–86. In 1987 he was given an appointment in Sports Quota in Pandian Roadways Corporation, Madurai. From 1989 to 1992, he played for ICF Chennai and during 1992–98 he was an Inspector Central Excise Madurai. From 2003 to 2005 he played for Air India on a contract basis.

== Coach ==
In 2004, Baskaran obtained a degree from the National Institute of Sports as a Specialist Coach. He was appointed as the Indian Coach for Junior Probables in Kabaddi in 2009. He rose to International attention during this period and was appointed as the Coach for Thailand National Kabaddi Team. In 2010 he coached the Malaysian National Kabaddi Team and was mainly associated with the preparation and selection process for the 2010 Asian Games. In 2014 he mentored the Indian Men's Kabaddi team for the Beach Asian Games 2014 held in Thailand. The team secured the bronze medal in the event.

== Pro Kabaddi League ==
In 2014 the Pro Kabaddi League began, a sports event for Kabaddi played among various Kabaddi franchises of India. K. Baskaran led the Pink Panthers franchise to its maiden victory at the inaugural event. He remained as the Pink Panthers coach from 2014 to 2016. He started coaching the Puneri Paltans franchise from 2016 and secured third place in season four. He was the head coach of Tamil Thalaivas in Pro Kabaddi 2017.

He was head coach for Vizag Whirlwinds in the Pro Kabaddi League.

== World Cup ==
India has an undisputed run as a champion in international Kabaddi matches. The 2016 Kabaddi World Cup was conducted among twelve nations. Baskaran acted as Coach for the Indian Men's team. The team went on to beat Iran in the finals and become champions for the third consecutive time.
