= 2015 Pro Kabaddi League =

2nd Season of Pro Kabaddi League

Pro Kabaddi League – 2015 Season 2
Tournament information
- Dates: 18 July 2015–23 August 2015
- Administrator: Mashal Sports
- Tournament format(s): Double round robin and playoffs
- Host: India
- Teams: 8
- Website: prokabaddi.com

Final positions
- Champion: U Mumba (1st title)

Tournament statistics
- Matches played: 60
- Most raid points: (India) Kashiling Adake (114)
- Most tackle points: (India) Ravindar Pahal (60)
- Most successful raid: (India) Kashiling Adake (87)

The 2015 Pro Kabaddi League was the second season of Pro Kabaddi League. The season started on 18 July 2015. 56 games were played amongst 8 teams. First game was played between U Mumba and Jaipur Pink Panthers. The event was broadcast live by Star Sports in India with commentary in 5 different languages - English, Telugu, Kannada, Tamil, & Hindi.

== Franchises ==
Locations of the 2015 Pro Kabaddi teams

=== Stadium and locations ===
Team	Location	Stadium
Bengal Warriors	Kolkata	Netaji Indoor Stadium
Bengaluru Bulls	Bengaluru	Kanteerava Indoor Stadium
Dabang Delhi	Delhi	Thyagaraj Sports Complex
Jaipur Pink Panthers	Jaipur	Sawai Mansingh Stadium
Patna Pirates	Patna	Patliputra Sports Complex
Puneri Paltan	Pune	Shree Shiv Chhatrapati Sports Complex
Telugu Titans	Visakhapatnam	Rajiv Gandhi Indoor Stadium
U Mumba	Mumbai	Sardar Vallabhbhai Patel Indoor Stadium, Mumbai

=== Personnel ===
Team	Owner(s)	Captain	Head coach
Bengal Warriors	Future Group	Jang Kun Lee	Raj Narain Sharma
Bengaluru Bulls	Kosmik Global Media	Manjit Chillar	Randhir Singh
Dabang Delhi	DO IT Sports Management	Ravinder Pahal	Arjun Singh
Jaipur Pink Panthers	Abhishek Bachchan	Jasvir Singh	Kasinathan Baskaran
Patna Pirates	Rajesh Shah	Sandeep Narwal	R S Khokhar
Puneri Paltan	Insurekot Sports	Wazir Singh	Ramphal Kaushik
Telugu Titans	Veera Sports	Miraj Sheikh	J Udayakumar
U Mumba	Unilazer Sports	Anup Kumar	E bhaskaran

== Fixtures and results ==
=== Points table ===
Team	Pld	W	L	D	SD	Pts
U Mumba (C)	14	12	2	0	40	60
Telugu Titans (3)	14	8	3	3	85	50
Bengaluru Bulls (R)	14	9	5	0	55	48
Patna Pirates (4)	14	7	6	1	-18	41
Jaipur Pink Panthers	14	6	7	1	43	38
Bengal Warriors	14	4	9	1	-63	27
Dabang Delhi KC	14	4	9	1	-68	27
Puneri Paltan	14	2	11	1	-74	21

Source: ProKabaddi
(C) Champion; (R) Runners-up; (3) Third Place; (4) Fourth Place.

- Advanced to the Playoff Stage
- Five points for a win
- Three points each for a drawn game
- One point for a loss by 7 points or fewer

== League stage ==
=== Leg 1:Sardar Vallabhbhai Patel Indoor Stadium, Mumbai ===
Match 1
18 July 2015
20:00

U Mumba	29 – 28	Jaipur Pink Panthers
	Report

U Mumba won

Match 2
18 July 2015
21:00

Bengaluru Bulls	33 – 25	Bengal Warriors
	Report

Bengaluru Bulls won

Match 3
19 July 2015
20:00

Telugu Titans	36 – 27	Dabang Delhi
	Report

Telugu Titans won

Match 4
19 July 2015
21:00

U Mumba	36 – 23	Bengaluru Bulls
	Report

U Mumba won

Match 5
20 July 2015
20:00

Puneri Paltan	24 – 45	Telugu Titans
	Report

Telugu Titans won

Match 6
20 July 2015
21:00

U Mumba	25 – 20	Patna Pirates
	Report

U Mumba won

Match 7
21 July 2015
20:00

U Mumba	28 – 21	Puneri Paltan
	Report

U Mumba won

=== Leg 2:Netaji Indoor Stadium, Kolkata ===
Match 8
22 July 2015
20:00

Bengal Warriors	28 – 26	Jaipur Pink Panthers
	Report

Bengal Warriors won

Match 9
22 July 2015
21:00

Bengaluru Bulls	31 – 26	Patna Pirates
	Report

Bengaluru Bulls won

Match 10
23 July 2015
20:00

Bengal Warriors	30 – 32	Telugu Titans
	Report

Telugu Titans won

Match 11
24 July 2015
20:00

Dabang Delhi	38 – 37	Puneri Paltan
	Report

Dabang Delhi won

Match 12
24 July 2015
21:00

Bengal Warriors	25 – 29	U Mumba
	Report

U Mumba won

Match 13
25 July 2015
20:00

Bengaluru Bulls	31 – 26	Puneri Paltan
	Report

Bengaluru Bulls won

Match 14
25 July 2015
21:00

Bengal Warriors	21 – 32	Dabang Delhi
	Report

Dabang Delhi won

=== Leg 3:Sawai Mansingh Indoor Stadium, Jaipur ===
Match 15
26 July 2015
20:00

Jaipur Pink Panthers	23 – 29	Patna Pirates
	Report

Patna Pirates won

Match 16
26 July 2015
21:00

Telugu Titans	26 – 27	U Mumba
	Report

U Mumba won

Match 17
27 July 2015
20:00

Dabang Delhi	18 – 33	Bengaluru Bulls
	Report

Bengaluru Bulls won

Match 18
27 July 2015
21:00

Jaipur Pink Panthers	22 – 33	Telugu Titans
	Report

Telugu Titans won

Match 19
28 July 2015
20:00

Jaipur Pink Panthers	36 – 23	Bengaluru Bulls
	Report

Jaipur Pink Panthers won

Match 20
29 July 2015
20:00

Puneri Paltan	33 – 29	Bengal Warriors
	Report

Puneri Paltan won

Match 21
29 July 2015
21:00

Jaipur Pink Panthers	27 – 35	Dabang Delhi
	Report

Dabang Delhi won

=== Leg 4:Patliputra Sports Complex, Patna ===
Match 22
30 July 2015
20:00

Patna Pirates	22 – 34	Telugu Titans
	Report

Telugu Titans won

Match 23
31 July 2015
20:00

Bengaluru Bulls	35 – 21	Telugu Titans
	Report

Bengaluru Bulls won

Match 24
31 July 2015
21:00

Patna Pirates	39 – 22	Dabang Delhi
	Report

Patna Pirates won

Match 25
1 August 2015
20:00

Dabang Delhi	22 – 27	U Mumba
	Report

U Mumba won

Match 26
1 August 2015
21:00

Patna Pirates	32 – 28	Puneri Paltan
	Report

Patna Pirates won

Match 27
2 August 2015
20:00

Puneri Paltan	29 – 35	Jaipur Pink Panthers
	Report

Jaipur Pink Panthers won

Match 28
2 August 2015
21:00

Patna Pirates	20 – 20	Bengal Warriors
	Report

Match Tied

=== Leg 5:Gachibowli Indoor Stadium, Hyderabad ===
Match 29
4 August 2015
20:00

Telugu Titans	39 – 39	Jaipur Pink Panthers
	Report

Match Tied

Match 30
4 August 2015
21:00

U Mumba	29 – 24	Dabang Delhi
	Report

U Mumba won

Match 31
5 August 2015
20:00

Telugu Titans	44 – 28	Bengal Warriors
	Report

Telugu Titans won

Match 32
6 August 2015
20:00

Bengal Warriors	22 – 33	Bengaluru Bulls
	Report

Bengaluru Bulls won

Match 33
6 August 2015
21:00

Telugu Titans	54 – 32	Patna Pirates
	Report

Telugu Titans won

Match 34
7 August 2015
20:00

Jaipur Pink Panthers	35 – 25	U Mumba
	Report

Jaipur Pink Panthers won

Match 35
7 August 2015
21:00

Telugu Titans	29 – 29	Puneri Paltan
	Report

Match Tied

=== Leg 6:Thyagaraj Sports Complex, Delhi ===
Match 36
8 August 2015
20:00

Dabang Delhi	17 – 20	Bengal Warriors
	Report

Bengal Warriors won

Match 37
8 August 2015
21:00

Patna Pirates	30 – 28	Bengaluru Bulls
	Report

Patna Pirates won

Match 38
9 August 2015
20:00

U Mumba	31 – 17	Bengal Warriors
	Report

U Mumba won

Match 39
9 August 2015
21:00

Dabang Delhi	45 – 26	Patna Pirates
	Report

Dabang Delhi won

Match 40
10 August 2015
20:00

Dabang Delhi	21 – 51	Jaipur Pink Panthers
	Report

Jaipur Pink Panthers won

Match 41
11 August 2015
20:00

Jaipur Pink Panthers	31 – 18	Puneri Paltan
	Report

Jaipur Pink Panthers won

Match 42
11 August 2015
21:00

Dabang Delhi	45 – 45	Telugu Titans
	Report

Match tied

=== Leg 7:Kanteerava Indoor Stadium, Bengaluru ===
Match 43
12 August 2015
20:00

Bengaluru Bulls	29 – 36	U Mumba
	Report

U Mumba won

Match 44
13 August 2015
20:00

Bengal Warriors	31 – 28	Puneri Paltan
	Report

Bengal Warriors won

Match 45
13 August 2015
21:00

Bengaluru Bulls	25 – 27	Jaipur Pink Panthers
	Report

Jaipur Pink Panthers won

Match 46
14 August 2015
20:00

Bengal Warriors	32 – 34	Patna Pirates
	Report

Patna Pirates won

Match 47
14 August 2015
21:00

Bengaluru Bulls	40 – 21	Dabang Delhi
	Report

Bengaluru Bulls won

Match 48
15 August 2015
20:00

Patna Pirates	27 – 32	U Mumba
	Report

U Mumba won

Match 49
15 August 2015
21:00

Bengaluru Bulls	43 – 29	Telugu Titans
	Report

Bengaluru Bulls won

=== Leg 8:Shree Shiv Chhatrapati Sports Complex, Pune ===
Match 50
16 August 2015
20:00

Puneri Paltan	33 – 28	Dabang Delhi
	Report

Puneri Paltan won

Match 51
16 August 2015
21:00

Jaipur Pink Panthers	38 – 39	Bengal Warriors
	Report

Bengal Warriors won

Match 52
17 August 2015
20:00

Puneri Paltan	34 – 39	U Mumba
	Report

U Mumba won

Match 53
18 August 2015
20:00

U Mumba	25 – 46	Telugu Titans
	Report

Telugu Titans won

Match 54
18 August 2015
21:00

Puneri Paltan	21 – 38	Patna Pirates
	Report

Patna Pirates won

Match 55
19 August 2015
20:00

Patna Pirates	26 – 24	Jaipur Pink Panthers
	Report

Patna Pirates won

Match 56
19 August 2015
21:00

Puneri Paltan	30 – 31	Bengaluru Bulls
	Report

Bengaluru Bulls won

== Playoff stage ==
Semi-Final 1

Match 57
21 August 2015
20:00

Telugu Titans	38 - 39	Bengaluru Bulls
	Report

Bengaluru Bulls won
Sardar Vallabhbhai Patel Indoor Stadium, Mumbai

Semi-Final 2

Match 58
21 August 2015
21:00

U Mumba	35 - 18	Patna Pirates
	Report

U Mumba won
Sardar Vallabhbhai Patel Indoor Stadium, Mumbai

3/4 Place

Match 59
23 August 2015
20:00

Patna Pirates	26 - 34	Telugu Titans
	Report

Telugu Titans won
Sardar Vallabhbhai Patel Indoor Stadium, Mumbai

FINAL

Match 60
23 August 2015
21:00

U Mumba	36 - 30	Bengaluru Bulls
	Report

U Mumba won
Sardar Vallabhbhai Patel Indoor Stadium, Mumbai

== Statistics ==
=== Most raid points ===
Player	Team	Match	Successful Raids	Points
(India) Kashiling Adake	Dabang Delhi	14	87	114
(India) Rahul Chaudhari	Telugu Titans	14	75	98
(India) Ajay Thakur	Bengaluru Bulls	13	56	79
(India) Anup Kumar	U Mumba	14	61	74
(India) Rajesh Narwal	Jaipur Pink Panthers	14	54	69

=== Most Tackle Points ===
Player	Team	Match	Tackles	Super	Points
(India) Ravindar Pahal	Dabang Delhi	14	53	7	60
(India) Sandeep Kandola	Telugu Titans	16	55	4	59
(India) Dharmaraj Cheralathan	Bengaluru Bulls	15	41	1	42
(India) Mohit Chillar	U Mumba	14	39	3	42
(India) Surender Nada	U Mumba	14	39	2	41

=== Most Points ===
Player	Team	Match	Raid	Tackle	Total
(India) Kashiling Adake	Dabang Delhi	14	114	3	117
(India) Manjeet Chhillar	Bengaluru Bulls	16	67	40	107
(India) Rahul Chaudhari	Telugu Titans	14	98	9	107
(India) Deepak Niwas Hooda	Telugu Titans	15	60	36	96
(India) Rajesh Narwal	Jaipur Pink Panthers	14	69	18	87
