= 2014 Pro Kabaddi League =

1st Season of Pro Kabaddi League

Pro Kabaddi League – 2014 Season 1
- Le panga

Tournament information
- Dates: 26 July 2014–31 August 2014
- Administrator: Mashal Sports
- Tournament format(s): Double round robin and playoffs
- Host: India
- Teams: 8
- Website: prokabaddi.com

Final positions
- Champion: Jaipur Pink Panthers (1st title)

Tournament statistics
- Matches played: 60
- Most raid points: (India) Anup Kumar (169)
- Most tackle points: (India) Manjeet Chhillar (51) (India) Surender Nada (51)
- Most successful raid: (India) Anup Kumar (123)

The 2014 Pro Kabaddi League was the first season of Pro Kabaddi League. The duration of the season was from 26 July 2014 to 31 August 2014. There was double round robin matches along with two semi finals, third place and final games. 56 games were to be played in first round and 4 in play off stage making total of 60 games. 8 teams took part in first edition. First game was played on July 26 between U Mumba and Jaipur Pink Panthers and the final was played on August 31 at Sardar Vallabhbhai Patel Indoor Stadium, Mumbai. Jaipur Pink Panthers beat U Mumba by 35–24 to win the inaugural Pro Kabaddi League.

== Player auction ==
The first signing and auction of players for the 8 teams was held on 20 May 2014 in Mumbai. India's national kabaddi captain Rakesh Kumar was the priciest among the players bought for ₹12.80 lakh by Patna franchise. Sports Authority of India's Deepak Niwas Hooda was bought by Vizag franchise for ₹12.90 lakh. Mostafa Noudehi was the highest paid overseas player bought for ₹6.6 lakh by Pune franchise.

== Franchises ==
Locations of the 2014 Pro Kabaddi teams

=== Stadium and locations ===
Team	Location	Stadium
Bengal Warriors	Kolkata	Netaji Indoor Stadium
Bengaluru Bulls	Bengaluru	Kanteerava Indoor Stadium
Dabang Delhi	Delhi	Thyagaraj Sports Complex
Jaipur Pink Panthers	Jaipur	Sawai Mansingh Stadium
Patna Pirates	Patna	Patliputra Sports Complex
Puneri Paltan	Pune	Shree Shiv Chhatrapati Sports Complex
Telugu Titans	Visakhapatnam	Rajiv Gandhi Indoor Stadium
U Mumba	Mumbai	Sardar Vallabhbhai Patel Indoor Stadium, Mumbai

=== Personnel ===
Team	Owner(s)	Captain	Head coach
Bengal Warriors	Future Group	Nilesh Shinde	Raj Narain Sharma
Bengaluru Bulls	Kosmik Global Media	Manjeet Chillar	Randhir Singh
Dabang Delhi	DO IT Sports Management	Jasmer Singh	Arjun Singh
Jaipur Pink Panthers	Abhishek Bachchan	Navneet Gautam	Kasinathan Baskaran
Patna Pirates	Rajesh Shah	Rakesh Kumar	R S Khokhar
Puneri Paltan	Insurekot Sports	Wazir Singh	Ramphal Kaushik
Telugu Titans	Veera Sports	Rajaguru Subramanian	J Udayakumar
U Mumba	Unilazer Sports	Anup Kumar	Ravi Shetty

== Points table ==
Team	Pld	W	L	D	SD	Pts
Jaipur Pink Panthers (C)	14	10	3	1	100	54
U Mumba (R)	14	8	3	3	59	51
Bengaluru Bulls (4)	14	8	5	1	36	47
Patna Pirates (3)	14	7	5	2	18	45
Telugu Titans	14	6	5	3	26	42
Dabang Delhi KC	14	5	8	1	-27	32
Bengal Warriors	14	4	9	1	-85	24
Puneri Paltan	14	2	12	0	-127	17

Source: ProKabaddi

(C) Champion; (R) Runners-up; (3) Third Place; (4) Fourth Place.

- Advanced to the Playoff Stage
- Five points for a win
- Three points each for a drawn game
- One point for a loss by 7 points or fewer
- Top 4 teams qualified for the semifinals

== Match schedule ==
=== Leg 1: Sardar Vallabhbhai Patel Indoor Stadium, Mumbai ===
Match 1
26 July 2014
08:00 PM

U Mumba	45 - 31	Jaipur Pink Panthers
	Scorecard

U Mumba won

Match 2
26 July 2014
09:00 PM

Dabang Delhi	28 - 47	Bengaluru Bulls
	Scorecard

Bengaluru Bulls won

Match 3
27 July 2014
08:00 PM

Bengaluru Bulls	40 - 37	Puneri Paltan
	Scorecard

Bengaluru Bulls won

Match 4
27 July 2014
09:00 PM

U Mumba	36 - 25	Bengal Warriors
	Scorecard

U Mumba won

Match 5
28 July 2014
08:00 PM

Puneri Paltan	31 - 35	Dabang Delhi
	Scorecard

Dabang Delhi won

Match 6
28 July 2014
09:00 PM

U Mumba	35 - 35	Telugu Titans
	Scorecard

Match Tied

Match 7
29 July 2014
08:00 PM

U Mumba	36 - 33	Patna Pirates
	Scorecard

U Mumba won

=== Leg 2: Netaji Indoor Stadium, Kolkata ===
Match 8
30 July 2014
08:00 PM

Bengal Warriors	30 - 46	Bengaluru Bulls
	Scorecard

Bengaluru Bulls won

Match 9
31 July 2014
08:00 PM

Jaipur Pink Panthers	46 - 32	Telugu Titans
	Scorecard

Jaipur Pink Panthers won

Match 10
31 July 2014
09:00 PM

Bengal Warriors	42 - 40	Dabang Delhi
	Scorecard

Bengal Warriors won

Match 11
1 August 2014
08:00 PM

Telugu Titans	35 - 38	Patna Pirates
	Scorecard

Patna Pirates won

Match 12
1 August 2014
09:00 PM

Bengal Warriors	38 - 35	Puneri Paltan
	Scorecard

Bengal Warriors won

Match 13
2 August 2014
08:00 PM

Patna Pirates	18 - 40	Jaipur Pink Panthers
	Scorecard

Jaipur Pink Panthers won

Match 14
2 August 2014
09:00 PM

Bengal Warriors	29 - 38	U Mumba
	Scorecard

U Mumba won

=== Leg 3: Thyagaraj Sports Complex, New Delhi ===
Match 15
3 August 2014
08:00 PM

Dabang Delhi	35 - 39	Telugu Titans
	Scorecard

Telugu Titans won

Match 16
3 August 2014
09:00 PM

Puneri Paltan	33 - 31	Bengaluru Bulls
	Scorecard

Puneri Paltan won

Match 17
4 August 2014
08:00 PM

U Mumba	44 - 28	Puneri Paltan
	Scorecard

U Mumba won

Match 18
4 August 2014
09:00 PM

Dabang Delhi	31 - 36	Patna Pirates
	Scorecard

Patna Pirates won

Match 19
5 August 2014
08:00 PM

Bengaluru Bulls	34 - 45	U Mumba
	Scorecard

U Mumba won

Match 20
5 August 2014
09:00 PM

Dabang Delhi	31 - 40	Jaipur Pink Panthers
	Scorecard

Jaipur Pink Panthers won

Match 21
6 August 2014
08:00 PM

Dabang Delhi	46 - 36	Bengal Warriors
	Scorecard

Dabang Delhi won

=== Leg 4: Patliputra Sports Complex, Patna ===
Match 22
7 Aug 2014
8:00 PM

Patna Pirates	35 - 27	Puneri Paltan
	Scorecard

Patna Pirates won

Match 23
8 Aug 2014
8:00 PM

Bengal Warriors	40 - 35	Telugu Titans
	Scorecard

Bengal Warriors won

Match 24
8 Aug 2014
9:00 PM

Patna Pirates	37 - 37	U Mumba
	Scorecard

Match Tied

Match 25
9 Aug 2014
8:00 PM

Telugu Titans	29 - 49	Jaipur Pink Panthers
	Scorecard

Jaipur Pink Panthers won

Match 26
9 Aug 2014
9:00 PM

Patna Pirates	30 - 30	Dabang Delhi
	Scorecard

Match Tied

Match 27
10 Aug 2014
8:00 PM

Jaipur Pink Panthers	39 - 23	Bengal Warriors
	Scorecard

Jaipur Pink Panthers won

Match 28
10 Aug 2014
9:00 PM

Patna Pirates	35 - 37	Bengaluru Bulls
	Scorecard

Bengaluru Bulls won

=== Leg 5: Shree Shiv Chhatrapati Sports Complex, Pune ===
Match 29
12 Aug 2014
8:00 PM

Puneri Paltan	36 - 42	Telugu Titans
	Scorecard

Puneri Paltan won

Match 30
13 Aug 2014
8:00 PM

U Mumba	30 - 33	Bengaluru Bulls
	Scorecard

Bengaluru Bulls won

Match 31
13 Aug 2014
9:00 PM

Puneri Paltan	40 - 30	Bengal Warriors
	Scorecard

Puneri Paltan won

Match 32
14 Aug 2014
8:00 PM

Bengaluru Bulls	27 - 29	Dabang Delhi
	Scorecard

Dabang Delhi won

Match 33
14 Aug 2014
9:00 PM

Puneri Paltan	23 - 50	Jaipur Pink Panthers
	Scorecard

Jaipur Pink Panthers won

Match 34
15 Aug 2014
8:00 PM

Dabang Delhi	36 - 27	U Mumba
	Scorecard

Dabang Delhi won

Match 35
15 Aug 2014
9:00 PM

Puneri Paltan	31 - 37	Patna Pirates
	Scorecard

Patna Pirates won

=== Leg 6: Rajiv Gandhi Indoor Stadium, Vizag ===
Match 36
16 Aug 2014
8:00 PM

Telugu Titans	28 - 28	Bengaluru Bulls
	Scorecard

Match Tied

Match 37
16 Aug 2014
9:00 PM

Bengal Warriors	33 - 41	Jaipur Pink Panthers
	Scorecard

Jaipur Pink Panthers won

Match 38
17 Aug 2014
8:00 PM

Jaipur Pink Panthers	30 - 52	Patna Pirates
	Scorecard

Patna Pirates won

Match 39
17 Aug 2014
9:00 PM

Telugu Titans	44 - 43	U Mumba
	Scorecard

Telugu Titans won

Match 40
18 Aug 2014
8:00 PM

Patna Pirates	28 - 30	Bengal Warriors
	Scorecard

Bengal Warriors won

Match 41
18 Aug 2014
9:00 PM

Telugu Titans	60 - 24	Puneri Paltan
	Scorecard

Telugu Titans won

Match 42
19 Aug 2014
8:00 PM

Telugu Titans	45 - 26	Dabang Delhi
	Scorecard

Telugu Titans won

=== Leg 7:Sawai Mansingh Stadium, Jaipur ===
Match 43
20 Aug 2014
8:00 PM

Jaipur Pink Panthers	36 - 31	Bengaluru Bulls
	Scorecard

Jaipur Pink Panthers won

Match 44
21 Aug 2014
8:00 PM

Bengal Warriors	32 - 36	Patna Pirates
	Scorecard

Patna Pirates won

Match 45
21 Aug 2014
9:00 PM

Jaipur Pink Panthers	31 - 31	U Mumba
	Scorecard

Match Tied

Match 46
22 Aug 2014
8:00 PM

Telugu Titans	34 - 34	Bengal Warriors
	Scorecard

Match Tied

Match 47
22 Aug 2014
9:00 PM

Jaipur Pink Panthers	41 - 31	Dabang Delhi
	Scorecard

Jaipur Pink Panthers won

Match 48
23 Aug 2014
8:00 PM

Patna Pirates	29 - 32	Telugu Titans
	Scorecard

Telugu Titans won

Match 49
23 Aug 2014
9:00 PM

Jaipur Pink Panthers	33 - 27	Puneri Paltan
	Scorecard

Jaipur Pink Panthers won

=== Leg 8:Sree Kanteerava Stadium, Bengaluru ===
Match 50
24 Aug 2014
8:00 PM

Bengaluru Bulls	37 - 24	Bengal Warriors
	Scorecard

Bengaluru Bulls won

Match 51
24 Aug 2014
9:00 PM

U Mumba	37 - 30	Dabang Delhi
	Scorecard

U Mumba won

Match 52
25 Aug 2014
8:00 PM

Dabang Delhi	45 - 22	Puneri Paltan
	Scorecard

Dabang Delhi won

Match 53
25 Aug 2014
9:00 PM

Bengaluru Bulls	31 - 33	Patna Pirates
	Scorecard

Patna Pirates won

Match 54
26 Aug 2014
8:00 PM

Bengaluru Bulls	27 - 26	Telugu Titans
	Scorecard

Bengaluru Bulls won

Match 55
27 Aug 2014
8:00 PM

Puneri Paltan	35 - 36	U Mumba
	Scorecard

U Mumba won

Match 56
27 Aug 2014
9:00 PM

Bengaluru Bulls	30 - 29	Jaipur Pink Panthers
	Scorecard

Bengaluru Bulls won

== Playoff stage ==
All matches were played in Mumbai

Semi-Final 1

Match 57
29 August 2014
08:00 PM

Jaipur Pink Panthers	38 - 18	Patna Pirates
	Scorecard

Jaipur Pink Panthers won
Sardar Vallabhbhai Patel Indoor Stadium, Mumbai

Semi-Final 2

Match 58
29 August 2014
09:00 PM

U Mumba	27 - 23	Bengaluru Bulls
	Scorecard

U Mumba won
Sardar Vallabhbhai Patel Indoor Stadium, Mumbai

3/4 Place

Match 59
31 August 2014
08:00 PM

Patna Pirates	29 - 22	Bengaluru Bulls
	Scorecard

Patna Pirates won
Sardar Vallabhbhai Patel Indoor Stadium, Mumbai

FINAL

Match 60
31 August 2014
09:00 PM

Jaipur Pink Panthers	35 - 24	U Mumba
	Scorecard

Jaipur Pink Panthers won
Sardar Vallabhbhai Patel Indoor Stadium, Mumbai

== Statistics ==
=== Top 5 Raiders ===
No.	Player	Team	Matches	Points
1	Anup Kumar	U Mumba	16	155
2	Rahul Chaudhari	Telugu Titans	14	151
3	Maninder Singh	Jaipur Pink Panthers	16	130
4	Ajay Thakur	Bengaluru Bulls	15	122
5	Kashiling Adake	Dabang Delhi	14	113
5	Surjeet Narwal	Dabang Delhi	14	113

=== Top 5 Defenders ===
No.	Player	Team	Matches	Points
1	Manjeet Chillar	Bengaluru Bulls	16	51
1	Surender Nada	U Mumba	15	51
3	Dharmaraj Cheralathan	Bengaluru Bulls	16	39
4	Rohit Rana	Jaipur Pink Panthers	14	38
4	Jasmer Singh Gulia	Dabang Delhi	15	38
