= 2016 Pro Kabaddi League (June) =

4th Season of Pro Kabaddi League

Pro Kabaddi League – June 2016 Season 4
Tournament information
- Dates: 25 June 2016–31 July 2016
- Administrator: Mashal Sports
- Tournament format(s): Double round robin and playoffs
- Host(s): India
- Teams: 8
- Website: prokabaddi.com

Final positions
- Champion: Patna Pirates (2nd title)

Tournament statistics
- Matches played: 60
- Most raid points: (India) Rahul Chaudhari (146)
- Most tackle points: (Iran) Fazel Atrachali (52)
- Most successful raid: (India) Rahul Chaudhari (110)

The 2016 Pro Kabaddi League season was the fourth season of Pro Kabaddi League, that ran from 25 June to 31 July 2016.

== Teams ==
Locations of the 2016 Pro Kabaddi teams season 4

=== Stadium and locations ===
Team	Location	Stadium
Bengal Warriors	Kolkata	Netaji Indoor Stadium
Bengaluru Bulls	Bengaluru	Kanteerava Indoor Stadium
Dabang Delhi	Delhi	Thyagaraj Sports Complex
Jaipur Pink Panthers	Jaipur	Sawai Mansingh Stadium
Patna Pirates	Patna	Patliputra Sports Complex
Puneri Paltan	Pune	Shree Shiv Chhatrapati Sports Complex
Telugu Titans	Visakhapatnam	Rajiv Gandhi Indoor Stadium
U Mumba	Mumbai	Sardar Vallabhbhai Patel Indoor Stadium, Mumbai

=== Personnel ===
Team	Owner(s)	Captain	Head coach
Bengal Warriors	Birthright games pvt.ltd	Nilesh Shinde	Pratap shetty
Bengaluru Bulls	Kosmik Global Media	Surender Nada/Mohit Chhillar	Randhir Singh
Dabang Delhi	Radha Kapoor	Miraj Sheykh	Sagar Bandekar
Jaipur Pink Panthers	Abhishek Bachchan	Jasvir Singh	Balwan Singh
Patna Pirates	Rajesh Shah	Dharmaraj Cheralathan	Arjun Singh
Puneri Paltan	Insurekot Sports	Manjeet Chhillar	Kasinathan Bhaskaran
Telugu Titans	Veera Sports	Rahul Chaudhari	J Udayakumar
U Mumba	Ronnie Screwvala	Anup Kumar	E. Bhaskaran

== Points table ==
Team	Pld	W	L	D	SD	Pts
Patna Pirates (C)	14	10	4	0	14	52
Telugu Titans	14	8	4	2	67	50
Jaipur Pink Panthers (R)	14	8	5	1	22	47
Puneri Paltan	14	6	6	2	23	42
U Mumba	14	7	6	1	-18	42
Bengaluru Bulls	14	5	8	1	-55	32
Dabang Delhi KC	14	4	9	1	7	29
Bengal Warriors	14	3	9	2	-60	26

Source:www.prokabaddi.com

- Advanced to the Playoff Stage
- Five (5) points for a win
- Three (3) points each for a drawn game
- One (1) point for a loss by 7 points or fewer

== League stage ==
=== Leg 1: Shree Shiv Chhatrapati Sports Complex, Pune ===
Match 29
25 June 2016
20:00

Puneri Paltan	28 – 24	Telugu Titans
	Report

Puneri Paltan
Shree Shiv Chhatrapati Sports Complex, Pune

Match 30
25 June 2016
21:00

U Mumba	36 – 34	Jaipur Pink Panthers
	Report

U Mumba
Shree Shiv Chhatrapati Sports Complex, Pune

Match 31
26 June 2016
20:00

Bengaluru Bulls	24 – 23	Bengal Warriors
	Report

Bengaluru Bulls
Shree Shiv Chhatrapati Sports Complex, Pune

Match 32
26 June 2016
21:00

Puneri Paltan	41 –19	U Mumba
	Report

Puneri Paltan
Shree Shiv Chhatrapati Sports Complex, Pune

Match 33
27 June 2016
20:00

Bengal Warriors	31 – 23	Dabang Delhi K.C
	Report

Bengal Warriors
Shree Shiv Chhatrapati Sports Complex, Pune

Match 34
27 June 2016
21:00

Puneri Paltan	24 – 30	Patna Pirates
	Report

Patna Pirates
Shree Shiv Chhatrapati Sports Complex, Pune

Match 35
28 June 2016
20:00

Puneri Paltan	27 – 27	Dabang Delhi K.C
	Report

Match Tied
Shree Shiv Chhatrapati Sports Complex, Pune

=== Leg 2: Sawai Mansingh Stadium, Jaipur ===
Match 36
29 June 2016
20:00

Jaipur Pink Panthers	28 – 24	Telugu Titans
	Report

Telugu Titans

Match 37
29 June 2016
21:00

U Mumba	34 – 36	Puneri Paltan
	Report

Puneri Paltan
Sawai Mansingh Stadium, Jaipur

Match 38
30 June 2016
20:00

Jaipur Pink Panthers	28 – 28	Bengaluru Bulls
	Report

Match Tied
Sawai Mansingh Stadium, Jaipur

Match 39
1 July 2016
20:00

U Mumba	27 – 25	Dabang Delhi
	Report

U Mumba
Sawai Mansingh Stadium, Jaipur

Match 40
1 July 2016
21:00

Jaipur Pink Panthers	36 –33	Bengal Warriors
	Report

Jaipur Pink Panthers
Sawai Mansingh Stadium, Jaipur

Match 41
2 July 2016
20:00

Dabang Delhi	32 – 24	Bengaluru Bulls
	Report

Dabang Delhi
Sawai Mansingh Stadium, Jaipur

Match 42
2 July 2016
21:00

Jaipur Pink Panthers	28 – 33	Puneri Paltan
	Report

Puneri Paltan
Sawai Mansingh Stadium, Jaipur

=== Leg 3: Gachibowli Indoor Stadium, Hyderabad ===
Match 43
3 July 2016
20:00

Telugu Titans	33 – 35	Patna Pirates
	Report

Patna Pirates
Gachibowli Indoor Stadium, Hyderabad

Match 44
3 July 2016
21:00

Bengal Warriors	18 – 26	U Mumba
	Report

U Mumba
Gachibowli Indoor Stadium, Hyderabad

Match 45
4 July 2016
20:00

Bengaluru Bulls	29 – 27	Puneri Paltan
	Report

Bengaluru Bulls
Gachibowli Indoor Stadium, Hyderabad

Match 46
4 July 2016
21:00

Telugu Titans	35 – 18	Bengal Warriors
	Report

Telugu Titans
Gachibowli Indoor Stadium, Hyderabad

Match 47
5 July 2016
20:00

Telugu Titans	28 – 30	Bengaluru Bulls
	Report

Bengaluru Bulls
Gachibowli Indoor Stadium, Hyderabad

Match 48
6 July 2016
20:00

Dabang Delhi	26 – 51	Jaipur Pink Panthers
	Report

Jaipur Pink Panthers
Gachibowli Indoor Stadium, Hyderabad

Match 49
6 July 2016
21:00

Telugu Titans	35 – 30	U Mumba
	Report

Telugu Titans
Gachibowli Indoor Stadium, Hyderabad

=== Leg 4: Patliputra Sports Complex, Patna ===
Match 50
7 July 2016
20:00

Patna Pirates	31 – 25	Bengaluru Bulls
	Report

Patliputra Sports Complex, Patna

Match 51
8 July 2016
20:00

Bengaluru Bulls	23 – 24	U Mumba
	Report

Patliputra Sports Complex, Patna

Match 52
8 July 2016
21:00

Patna Pirates	35 - 21	Bengal Warriors
	Report

Patliputra Sports Complex, Patna

Match 53
9 July 2016
20:00

Bengal Warriors	31 - 38	Puneri Paltan
	Report

Patliputra Sports Complex, Patna

Match 54
9 July 2016
21:00

Patna Pirates	15 - 33	Dabang Delhi
	Report

Patliputra Sports Complex, Patna

Match 55
10 July 2016
20:00

Dabang Delhi	23 - 28	Telugu Titans
	Report

Patliputra Sports Complex, Patna

Match 56
10 July 2016
21:00

Patna Pirates	21 - 26	Jaipur Pink Panthers
	Report

Patliputra Sports Complex, Patna

=== Leg 5: Sree Kanteerava Stadium, Bengaluru ===
Match 57
12 Jul 2016
20:00

Bengaluru Bulls	24 - 32	Telugu Titans
	Report

Match 58
12 Jul 2016
21:00

Puneri Paltan	34 - 34	Bengal Warriors
	Report

Sree Kanteerava Stadium, Bengaluru

Match 59
13 Jul 2016
20:00

Bengaluru Bulls	22 - 24	Jaipur Pink Panthers
	Report

Sree Kanteerava Stadium, Bengaluru

Match 60
14 Jul 2016
20:00

Jaipur Pink Panthers	23 - 29	U Mumba
	Report

Sree Kanteerava Stadium, Bengaluru

Match 61
14 Jul 2016
21:00

Bengaluru Bulls	23 - 38	Patna Pirates
	Report

Sree Kanteerava Stadium, Bengaluru

Match 62
15 Jul 2016
20:00

Telugu Titans	32 - 29	Puneri Paltan
	Report

Sree Kanteerava Stadium, Bengaluru

Match 63
15 Jul 2016
21:00

Bengaluru Bulls	20 - 40	Dabang Delhi
	Report

Sree Kanteerava Stadium, Bengaluru

=== Leg 6: Netaji Indoor Stadium, Kolkata ===
Match 64
16 Jul 2016
20:00

Bengal Warriors	32 - 25	Jaipur Pink Panthers
	Report

Match 65
16 Jul 2016
21:00

Patna Pirates	34 - 24	U Mumba
	Report

Netaji Indoor Stadium, Kolkata

Match 66
17 Jul 2016
20:00

Puneri Paltan	27 - 33	Jaipur Pink Panthers
	Report

Netaji Indoor Stadium, Kolkata

Match 67
17 Jul 2016
21:00

Bengal Warriors	27 - 33	Patna Pirates
	Report

Netaji Indoor Stadium, Kolkata

Match 68
18 Jul 2016
20:00

Bengal Warriors	34 - 34	Telugu Titans
	Report

Netaji Indoor Stadium, Kolkata

Match 69
19 Jul 2016
20:00

Telugu Titans	36 - 28	Dabang Delhi
	Report

Netaji Indoor Stadium, Kolkata

Match 70
19 Jul 2016
21:00

Bengal Warriors	25 - 27	Bengaluru Bulls
	Report

Netaji Indoor Stadium, Kolkata

=== Leg 7: Sardar Vallabhbhai Patel Indoor Stadium, Mumbai ===
Match 71
20 Jul 2016
20:00

U Mumba	34 - 31	Puneri Paltan
	Report

Match 72
21 Jul 2016
20:00

Jaipur Pink Panthers	24 - 22	Dabang Delhi
	Report

Sardar Vallabhbhai Patel Indoor Stadium, Mumbai

Match 73
21 Jul 2016
21:00

U Mumba	25 - 25	Telugu Titans
	Report

Sardar Vallabhbhai Patel Indoor Stadium, Mumbai

Match 74
22 Jul 2016
20:00

Jaipur Pink Panthers	29 - 22	Patna Pirates
	Report

Sardar Vallabhbhai Patel Indoor Stadium, Mumbai

Match 75
22 Jul 2016
21:00

U Mumba	27 - 31	Bengal Warriors
	Report

Sardar Vallabhbhai Patel Indoor Stadium, Mumbai

Match 76
23 Jul 2016
20:00

Patna Pirates	31 - 28	Puneri Paltan
	Report

Sardar Vallabhbhai Patel Indoor Stadium, Mumbai

Match 77
23 Jul 2016
21:00

U Mumba	27 - 28	Bengaluru Bulls
	Report

Sardar Vallabhbhai Patel Indoor Stadium, Mumbai

=== Leg 8: Thyagaraj Sports Complex, Delhi ===
Match 78
24 Jul 2016
20:00

Dabang Delhi	41 - 20	Bengal Warriors
	Report

Match 79
24 Jul 2016
21:00

Telugu Titans	35 - 23	Jaipur Pink Panthers
	Report

Thyagaraj Sports Complex, Delhi

Match 80
25 Jul 2016
20:00

Dabang Delhi	31 - 32	Patna Pirates
	Report

Thyagaraj Sports Complex, Delhi

Match 81
26 Jul 2016
20:00

Patna Pirates	25 - 46	Telugu Titans
	Report

Thyagaraj Sports Complex, Delhi

Match 82
26 Jul 2016
21:00

Dabang Delhi	34 - 39	Puneri Paltan
	Report

Thyagaraj Sports Complex, Delhi

Match 83
27 Jul 2016
20:00

Puneri Paltan	36 - 33	Bengaluru Bulls
	Report

Thyagaraj Sports Complex, Delhi

Match 84
27 Jul 2016
21:00

Dabang Delhi	34 - 38	U Mumba
	Report

Thyagaraj Sports Complex, Delhi

== Playoff Stage ==
Semi-finals
3	Puneri Paltan	33
1	Patna Pirates	37
2	Jaipur Pink Panthers	34
4	Telugu Titans	24

Final
1	Patna Pirates	37
2	Jaipur Pink Panthers	29
3rd Place
3	Puneri Paltan	40
4	Telugu Titans	35

=== Semi-final ===
1st Semi final

29 Jul 2016
20:00

Patna Pirates	37 - 33	Puneri Paltan
	Report

Gachibowli Indoor Stadium, Hyderabad

2nd semi final

29 Jul 2016
21:00

Telugu Titans	24 - 34	Jaipur Pink Panthers
	Report

Gachibowli Indoor Stadium, Hyderabad

=== Third Place ===
31 Jul 2016
20:00

Telugu Titans	35 - 41	Puneri Paltan
	Report

Gachibowli Indoor Stadium, Hyderabad

=== Final ===
31 Jul 2016
21:15

Patna Pirates	37 - 29	Jaipur Pink Panthers
	Report

Gachibowli Indoor Stadium, Hyderabad

== Statistics ==
=== Top 10 Raiders ===
No.	Player	Team	Matches	Successful Raids	Raid Points
1	Rahul Chaudhari	Telugu Titans	16	110	146
2	Pardeep Narwal	Patna Pirates	16	100	131
3	Deepak Niwas Hooda	Puneri Paltan	16	108	126
4	Rohit Kumar	Bengaluru Bulls	14	75	93
5	Jasvir Singh	Jaipur Pink Panthers	14	64	82
6	Kashiling Adake	Dabang Delhi	13	58	78
7	Anup Kumar	U Mumba	14	60	72
8	Rishank Devadiga	U Mumba	14	57	70
9	Rajesh Narwal	Jaipur Pink Panthers	16	52	66
10	Ajay Thakur	Puneri Paltan	16	41	63
10	Meraj Sheykh	Dabang Delhi	14	42	63

=== Top 10 Defenders ===
No.	Player	Team	Matches	Successful Tackles	Super Tackles	Tackle Points
1	Fazel Atrachali	Patna Pirates	16	45	7	52
2	Amit Hooda	Jaipur Pink Panthers	16	47	4	51
3	Mohit Chhillar	Bengaluru Bulls	14	44	3	47
4	Manjeet Chhillar	Puneri Paltan	12	43	1	44
4	Sachin Shingade	Dabang Delhi	14	39	5	44
6	Sandeep Narwal	Telugu Titans	16	40	2	42
7	Dharmaraj Cheralathan	Patna Pirates	14	31	8	39
8	Ravinder Pahal	Puneri Paltan	14	35	2	37
8	Surjeet Singh	U Mumba	14	33	4	37
10	Sandeep Kumar Dhull	Telugu Titans	12	35	0	35
