= Maninder Singh (kabaddi) =

Indian kabaddi player

Personal information
- Nickname: Mighty Maninder
- Born: 31 January 1990 (age 36) Dasuya, Punjab, India
- Occupations: Police officer, Kabaddi Player
- Years active: 2014–present
- Height: 6 ft 0 in (183 cm)

Sport
- Country: India
- Sport: Kabaddi
- Position: Raider
- League: Pro Kabaddi League
- Club: Jaipur Pink Panthers (2014); Bengal Warriors (2017-2024); Patna Pirates (2025-present)
Medal record
Representing India
Kabaddi Asia Cup
Winner	2017 Kabaddi Asia Cup	Team

Maninder Singh is an Indian professional Kabaddi player who plays for the India national kabaddi Team. He is the captain and lead raider of Patna Pirates In the Pro Kabaddi League. Maninder is regarded as one of the best raiders in the league. He led Bengal Warriors to their maiden PKL trophy in 2019.

== Early life ==
Maninder Singh was born in the Hoshiarpur district of Punjab, India. He completed graduation from Khalsa College, Amritsar and currently lives in Jalandhar. He is employed to Punjab Police.

== Career ==
=== Season 1 ===
He started his career in the 2014 Pro Kabaddi League, playing for Jaipur Pink Panthers. The team won the inaugural season of the league and statistically he was rated as the third best raider of the Season with 130 raid points.

=== Season 5 ===
After this start to his career, he was injured and missed the next three seasons of the league before being bought by Bengal Warriors in 2017. He made a brilliant comeback and scored 190 raid Points in the season. He was a lethal raider on the mat and scored a lot of critical points for the side.

=== Season 6 ===
He became the fastest raider to score 400 and 500 raid points in the 2018–19 Pro Kabaddi League season. He scored 206 raid points from 22 matches.

=== Season 7 ===
In 2019, after not retaining PO Surjeet Singh who was their skipper for the past two seasons. Maninder was announced as the captain for his team. In a match against Patna Pirates, he became the second quickest raider after Pardeep Narwal (63 matches) to reach 600 points (68 matches) in the PKL. He led his team to the playoffs averaging 10 raid points per match. But in the penultimate league stage, he dislocated his shoulder and became injured. Which saw him sit out the remaining matches including semi final and final. But in the final, the team got support with his presence as assistant coach. Despite his absence off the mat, Bengal Warriors clinched their first ever PKL title by beating Dabang Delhi in The Arena. Maninder was just 2 Points short from his career best performance. However, his best performance came against Jaipur Pink Panthers, when he picked up 19 raid points from 24 raids in the Warriors' 41–40 win that propelled his team to the playoffs. His average of 10.25 points per game in the season was the best of his vivo Pro Kabaddi career and his tally of six Super Raids was bettered by only three other raiders.

=== Season 8 ===
In 2021–22 Pro Kabaddi League season, Maninder was retained as the captain of Bengal Warriors. In a match against U Mumba, he achieved a unique feat of having 100% raid contribution, scoring 17 raid points of his team alone. Maninder also achieved his career best 9 consecutive Super 10s (scoring 10 raid points in a match) in Season 8. on 24 January, in a match against Jaipur Pink Panthers, he became only the fourth player in Pro kabaddi history to cross the 900-raid point mark, second quickest (93 matches) after Pardeep Narwal. Despite Maninder's tremendous form, Bengal Warriors couldn't qualify for the playoffs. He became the third best raider of PKL 8 with 262 raid points. Mani scored 16 Super 10s and executed 11 super raids during the season. He proved himself as a multi-point raid specialist.

=== Season 9 ===
Bengal Warriors retained Maninder as their captain in season 9 of PKL. In Warriors' opening match against Haryana Steelers, he became only the second player after Pardeep Narwal to reach 1000 raid points in the history of the Pro Kabaddi League. On November 5, he scored his career best 20 raid points in a single match to register a 45–50 victory against Gujarat Giants.

== Career statistics ==
As of 18 February 2022.

Club Team	Season	Total Apps	Raid Points	Tackle Points	Total Points
Jaipur Pink Panthers	2014	16	130	7	137
Bengal Warriors	2017	21	190	2	192
Bengal Warriors	2018	22	206	0	206
Bengal Warriors	2019	20	205	0	205
Bengal Warriors	2021-22	22	262	2	264
Bengal Warriors	2022	21	238	2	240
Total		122	1231	13	1244

== Raid statistics ==
Season	Total Apps	Raid Points	Avg Raid Points	Successful Raids	Super Raids	Super 10s	D0-OR-Die Raid Points
2014	16	130	8.13	103	3	5	22
2017	21	190	9.05	154	6	9	22
2018	22	206	9.36	158	6	9	34
2019	20	205	10.25	171	6	10	24
2021-22	22	262	11.91	192	11	16	39
2022	21	238	11.33	180	11	14	19
2023-24	4	45	11.25	34	2	3	3
Total	126	1276	10.13	992	45	66	163
