= 2016 Pro Kabaddi League (January) =

3rd Season of Pro Kabaddi League

Pro Kabaddi League – January 2016 Season 3
Tournament information
- Dates: 30 January 2016–5 March 2016
- Administrator: Mashal Sports
- Tournament format(s): Double round robin and playoffs
- Host: India
- Teams: 8
- Website: prokabaddi.com

Final positions
- Champion: Patna Pirates (1st title)

Tournament statistics
- Matches played: 60
- Most raid points: (India) Pardeep Narwal (116)
- Most tackle points: (India) Manjeet Chhillar (61)
- Most successful raid: (India) Rishank Devadiga (86)

2016 Pro Kabaddi League season was the third season of Pro Kabaddi League, a professional kabaddi league played in India since 2014. Pro Kabaddi, which saw success in its second season, was all set to make its much awaited return for a third season from 30 January 2016, just five months after completion of the second season. Hyderabad hosted the opening leg of Season 3, with the first match being played between Telugu Titans and U Mumba at the Titan's home turf, Gachibowli Indoor Stadium.The winner is Patna Pirates.

Star Sports Pro Kabaddi, organized by Mashal Sports and Star India, in association with the International Kabaddi Federation, Asian Kabaddi Federation and the Amateur Kabaddi Federation of India is now going to be a bi-annual league with two seasons every year, promising much more action for the audiences and also encouraging them to take up to playing Kabaddi.

The third season of the league will feature 60 games played on specially developed mats, in state of the art indoor stadiums across 34 days in 8 cities. Following the same ‘caravan style’ format like in the first two seasons, the league will be played at each franchise city for a duration of 4 days, where the home team will play 4 of the visiting franchises. All seven visiting franchises will play a set of away games in each city.

After the opening leg in Hyderabad, the caravan will move to the Kanteerava Indoor Stadium, Bengaluru, followed by Netaji Indoor Stadium in Kolkata. This season, the badminton arena in the Balewadi Sports Complex, Pune will be the venue for the culmination to the first half of the league. The indoor stadium at the Patliputra Sports Complex, Patna will play host to the second half of the league with the caravan then moving to Sawai Mansingh Stadium in Jaipur on 20 February 2016. Moving on from Jaipur, the league will be played in at the Thyagaraj Indoor Stadium in Delhi and move to the home of the reigning champions, U Mumba at National Sports Club of India, Mumbai. The playoffs will return to the national capital for the semi-finals, playoffs and the finals.

== Franchises ==
Locations of the 2016 Pro Kabaddi teams

=== Stadium and locations ===
Team	Location	Stadium
Bengal Warriors	Kolkata	Netaji Indoor Stadium
Bengaluru Bulls	Bengaluru	Kanteerava Indoor Stadium
Dabang Delhi	Delhi	Thyagaraj Sports Complex
Jaipur Pink Panthers	Jaipur	Sawai Mansingh Stadium
Patna Pirates	Patna	Patliputra Sports Complex
Puneri Paltan	Pune	Shree Shiv Chhatrapati Sports Complex
Telugu Titans	Visakhapatnam	Rajiv Gandhi Indoor Stadium
U Mumba	Mumbai	Sardar Vallabhbhai Patel Indoor Stadium, Mumbai

== Points table ==
Team	Pld	W	L	D	SD	Pts
U Mumba (R)	14	12	2	0	95	60
Patna Pirates (C)	14	10	2	2	104	58
Puneri Paltan (3)	14	7	4	3	92	48
Bengal Warriors (4)	14	9	5	0	26	47
Telugu Titans	14	7	7	0	-10	38
Jaipur Pink Panthers	14	4	8	2	-63	28
Bengaluru Bulls	14	2	12	0	-102	14
Dabang Delhi KC	14	1	12	1	-142	11

Source: ProKabaddi

(C) Champion; (R) Runners-up; (3) Third Place; (4) Fourth Place.

- Advanced to the Playoff Stage
- Five points for a win
- Three points each for a drawn game
- One point for a loss by 7 points or fewer

== League stage ==
=== Leg 1: Rajiv Gandhi Indoor Stadium, Vizag ===
Match 1
30 January 2016
20:00

Telugu Titans	25–27	U Mumba
	Scorecard

U Mumba won
Rajiv Gandhi Indoor Stadium, Vizag

Match 2
30 January 2016
21:00

Dabang Delhi	29–35	Bengaluru Bulls
	Scorecard

Bengaluru Bulls won
Rajiv Gandhi Indoor Stadium, Vizag

Match 3
31 January 2016
20:00

Jaipur Pink Panthers	27–18	U Mumba
	Scorecard

Jaipur Pink Panthers won
Rajiv Gandhi Indoor Stadium, Vizag

Match 4
31 January 2016
21:00

Telugu Titans	27–26	Puneri Paltan
	Scorecard

Telugu Titans won
Rajiv Gandhi Indoor Stadium, Vizag

Match 5
1 February 2016
20:00

Patna Pirates	29–28	Jaipur Pink Panthers
	Scorecard

Patna Pirates won
Rajiv Gandhi Indoor Stadium, Vizag

Match 6
1 February 2016
21:00

Telugu Titans	45–34	Dabang Delhi
	Scorecard

Telugu Titans won
Rajiv Gandhi Indoor Stadium, Vizag

Match 7
2 February 2016
20:00

Telugu Titans	27–18	Bengal Warriors
	Scorecard

Telugu Titans won
Rajiv Gandhi Indoor Stadium, Vizag

=== Leg 2: Sree Kanteerava Stadium, Bengaluru ===
Match 8
3 February 2016
20:00

Bengaluru Bulls	24–33	Patna Pirates
	Scorecard

Patna Pirates won

Match 9
3 February 2016
21:00

Dabang Delhi	20–38	Puneri Paltan
	Scorecard

Puneri Paltan won
Sree Kanteerava Stadium, Bengaluru

Match 10
4 February 2016
20:00

Bengaluru Bulls	24–34	Bengal Warriors
	Scorecard

Bengal Warriors won
Sree Kanteerava Stadium, Bengaluru

Match 11
5 February 2016
20:00

Dabang Delhi	17–30	U Mumba
	Scorecard

U Mumba won
Sree Kanteerava Stadium, Bengaluru

Match 12
5 February 2016
21:00

Bengaluru Bulls	36–26	Jaipur Pink Panthers
	Scorecard

Bengaluru Bulls won
Sree Kanteerava Stadium, Bengaluru

Match 13
6 February 2016
20:00

U Mumba	26–40	Patna Pirates
	Scorecard

Patna Pirates won
Sree Kanteerava Stadium, Bengaluru

Match 14
6 February 2016
21:00

Bengaluru Bulls	26–35	Telugu Titans
	Scorecard

Telugu Titans won
Sree Kanteerava Stadium, Bengaluru

=== Leg 3: Netaji Indoor Stadium, Kolkata ===
Match 15
7 February 2016
20:00

Bengal Warriors	33–28	Puneri Paltan
	Scorecard

Bengal Warriors won

Match 16
7 February 2016
21:00

Jaipur Pink Panthers	39–34	Dabang Delhi
	Scorecard

Jaipur Pink Panthers won
Netaji Indoor Stadium, Kolkata

Match 17
8 February 2016
20:00

Patna Pirates	29–25	Telugu Titans
	Scorecard

Patna Pirates won
Netaji Indoor Stadium, Kolkata

Match 18
8 February 2016
21:00

Bengal Warriors	34–17	Dabang Delhi
	Scorecard

Bengal Warriors won
Netaji Indoor Stadium, Kolkata

Match 19
9 February 2016
20:00

Bengal Warriors	31–36	Patna Pirates
	Scorecard

Patna Pirates won
Netaji Indoor Stadium, Kolkata

Match 20
10 February 2016
20:00

U Mumba	29–28	Bengaluru Bulls
	Scorecard

U Mumba won
Netaji Indoor Stadium, Kolkata

Match 21
10 February 2016
21:00

Bengal Warriors	34–20	Jaipur Pink Panthers
	Scorecard

Bengal Warriors won
Netaji Indoor Stadium, Kolkata

=== Leg 4: Shree Shiv Chhatrapati Sports Complex, Pune ===
Match 22
11 February 2016
20:00

Puneri Paltan	30–30	Patna Pirates
	Scorecard

Match Tied

Match 23
12 February 2016
20:00

Patna Pirates	47–34	Dabang Delhi
	Scorecard

Patna Pirates won
Shree Shiv Chhatrapati Sports Complex, Pune

Match 24
12 February 2016
21:00

Puneri Paltan	32–32	Jaipur Pink Panthers
	Scorecard

Match Tied
Shree Shiv Chhatrapati Sports Complex, Pune

Match 25
13 February 2016
20:00

Jaipur Pink Panthers	25–27	Telugu Titans
	Scorecard

Telugu Titans won
Shree Shiv Chhatrapati Sports Complex, Pune

Match 26
13 February 2016
21:00

Puneri Paltan	27–29	U Mumba
	Scorecard

U Mumba won
Shree Shiv Chhatrapati Sports Complex, Pune

Match 27
14 February 2016
20:00

U Mumba	32–21	Bengal Warriors
	Scorecard

U Mumba won
Shree Shiv Chhatrapati Sports Complex, Pune

Match 28
14 February 2016
21:00

Puneri Paltan	29–27	Bengaluru Bulls
	Scorecard

Puneri Paltan won
Shree Shiv Chhatrapati Sports Complex, Pune

=== Leg 5: Patliputra Sports Complex, Patna ===
Match 29
16 February 2016
20:00

Patna Pirates	32–27	Bengal Warriors
	Scorecard

Patna Pirates won
Patliputra Sports Complex, Patna

Match 30
16 February 2016
21:00

Telugu Titans	26–35	Jaipur Pink Panthers
	Scorecard

Jaipur Pink Panthers won
Patliputra Sports Complex, Patna

Match 31
17 February 2016
20:00

Patna Pirates	36–22	Bengaluru Bulls
	Scorecard

Patna Pirates won
Patliputra Sports Complex, Patna

Match 32
18 February 2016
20:00

Bengaluru Bulls	21–35	Dabang Delhi
	Scorecard

Dabang Delhi won
Patliputra Sports Complex, Patna

Match 33
18 February 2016
21:00

Patna Pirates	28–28	Puneri Paltan
	Scorecard

Match Tied
Patliputra Sports Complex, Patna

Match 34
19 February 2016
20:00

Bengal Warriors	32–28	Telugu Titans
	Scorecard

Bengal Warriors won
Patliputra Sports Complex, Patna

Match 35
19 February 2016
21:00

Patna Pirates	28–34	U Mumba
	Scorecard

U Mumba won
Patliputra Sports Complex, Patna

=== Leg 6: Sawai Mansingh Stadium, Jaipur ===
Match 36
20 February 2016
20:00

Jaipur Pink Panthers	30–21	Bengaluru Bulls
	Scorecard

Jaipur Pink Panthers won

Match 37
20 February 2016
21:00

Puneri Paltan	32–22	Dabang Delhi
	Scorecard

Puneri Paltan won
Sawai Mansingh Stadium, Jaipur

Match 38
21 February 2016
20:00

Telugu Titans	40–22	Bengaluru Bulls
	Scorecard

Telugu Titans won
Sawai Mansingh Stadium, Jaipur

Match 39
21 February 2016
21:00

Jaipur Pink Panthers	18–33	Puneri Paltan
	Scorecard

Puneri Paltan won
Sawai Mansingh Stadium, Jaipur

Match 40
22 February 2016
20:00

Jaipur Pink Panthers	18–34	Bengal Warriors
	Scorecard

Bengal Warriors won
Sawai Mansingh Stadium, Jaipur

Match 41
23 February 2016
20:00

Bengal Warriors	17–30	U Mumba
	Scorecard

U Mumba won
Sawai Mansingh Stadium, Jaipur

Match 42
23 February 2016
21:00

Jaipur Pink Panthers	24–47	Patna Pirates
	Scorecard

Patna Pirates won
Sawai Mansingh Stadium, Jaipur

=== Leg 7: Thyagaraj Sports Complex, Delhi ===
Match 43
24 February 2016
20:00

Dabang Delhi	36–44	Telugu Titans
	Scorecard

Telugu Titans won

Match 44
25 February 2016
20:00

Bengaluru Bulls	18–39	U Mumba
	Scorecard

U Mumba won
Thyagaraj Sports Complex, Delhi

Match 45
25 February 2016
21:00

Dabang Delhi	34–67	Patna Pirates
	Scorecard

Patna Pirates won
Thyagaraj Sports Complex, Delhi

Match 46
26 February 2016
20:00

Puneri Paltan	41–24	Telugu Titans
	Scorecard

Puneri Paltan won
Thyagaraj Sports Complex, Delhi

Match 47
26 February 2016
21:00

Dabang Delhi	21–21	Jaipur Pink Panthers
	Scorecard

Match Tied
Thyagaraj Sports Complex, Delhi

Match 48
27 February 2016
20:00

Bengaluru Bulls	27–44	Puneri Paltan
	Scorecard

Puneri Paltan won
Thyagaraj Sports Complex, Delhi

Match 49
27 February 2016
21:00

Dabang Delhi	31–37	Bengal Warriors
	Scorecard

Bengal Warriors won
Thyagaraj Sports Complex, Delhi

=== Leg 8: Sardar Vallabhbhai Patel Indoor Stadium, Mumbai ===
Match 50
28 February 2016
20:00

U Mumba	35–21	Jaipur Pink Panthers
	Scorecard

U Mumba won

Match 51
28 February 2016
21:00

Telugu Titans	42–41	Patna Pirates
	Scorecard

Telugu Titans won
Sardar Vallabhbhai Patel Indoor Stadium, Mumbai

Match 52
29 February 2016
20:00

U Mumba	30–27	Puneri Paltan
	Scorecard

U Mumba won
Sardar Vallabhbhai Patel Indoor Stadium, Mumbai

Match 53
1 March 2016
20:00

Bengal Warriors	26–22	Bengaluru Bulls
	Scorecard

Bengal Warriors won
Sardar Vallabhbhai Patel Indoor Stadium, Mumbai

Match 54
1 March 2016
21:00

U Mumba	38–22	Telugu Titans
	Scorecard

U Mumba won
Sardar Vallabhbhai Patel Indoor Stadium, Mumbai

Match 55
2 March 2016
20:00

Puneri Paltan	43–19	Bengal Warriors
	Scorecard

Puneri Paltan won
Sardar Vallabhbhai Patel Indoor Stadium, Mumbai

Match 56
2 March 2016
21:00

U Mumba	36–20	Dabang Delhi
	Scorecard

U Mumba won
Sardar Vallabhbhai Patel Indoor Stadium, Mumbai

== Playoff stage ==
All matches played at Indira Gandhi Indoor Stadium, New Delhi.

Semi-finals
4 March 20:00
Patna Pirates	40
Puneri Paltan	21
4 March 21:00
U Mumba	41
Bengal Warriors	29

Final
5 March 21:00
Patna Pirates	31
U Mumba	28
Third place
5 March 20:00
Puneri Paltan	31
Bengal Warriors	27

=== Semi-final ===
1st semi-final

Match 57
4 March 2016
20:00

Patna Pirates	40–21	Puneri Paltan
	Scorecard

Patna Pirates won
Indira Gandhi Indoor Stadium, Delhi

2nd semi-final

Match 58
4 March 2016
21:00

U Mumba	41–29	Bengal Warriors
	Scorecard

U Mumba won
Indira Gandhi Indoor Stadium, Delhi

=== Third place ===
Match 59
5 March 2016
20:00

Puneri Paltan	31– 27	Bengal Warriors
	Report

Puneri Paltan won
Thyagaraj Sports Complex, Delhi

=== Final ===
Match 60
5 March 2016
21:00

Patna Pirates	31–28	U Mumba
	Report

Patna Pirates won and became the champions of PKL.
Thyagaraj Sports Complex, Delhi

== Statistics ==
=== Top 5 Raiders ===
No	Player	Team	Matches	Successful Raids	Raid Points
1	Pardeep Narwal	Patna Pirates	15	83	116
2	Rishank Devadiga	U Mumba	16	86	106
3	Rohit Kumar	Patna Pirates	12	80	102
4	Rahul Chaudhari	Telugu Titans	13	77	87
5	Jang Kun Lee	Bengal Warriors	15	64	79

=== Top 5 Defenders ===
No.	Player	Team	Matches	Successful Tackles	Super Tackles	Total Tackle Points
1	Manjeet Chhillar	Puneri Paltan	15	56	5	61
2	Sandeep Narwal	Patna Pirates	14	53	2	55
3	Surjeet Singh	Puneri Paltan	12	47	1	48
4	Mohit Chhillar	U Mumba	13	44	2	46
4	Jasmer Singh Gulia	Puneri Paltan	16	41	5	46

=== Team statistics ===
Rank	Team	Successful Raids	Successful Raids Per Match	Successful Tackle	Successful Tackle Per Match	Super Tackles
1	Patna Pirates	241	15.06	175	10.93	7
2	U Mumba	206	12.88	163	10.18	6
3	Puneri Paltan	203	12.69	174	10.87	13
4	Bengal Warriors	213	13.31	137	8.56	13
5	Telugu Titans	206	14.71	101	7.21	15
6	Jaipur Pink Panthers	149	10.64	101	7.21	16
7	Bungaluru Bulls	158	11.29	94	6.71	6
8	Dabang Delhi	171	12.21	98	7	13

Source :

== Final Cash Awards ==
Position	Team	Award
1st	Patna Pirates	1,00,00,000/-
2nd	U Mumba	50,00,000/-
3rd	Puneri Paltan	30,00,000/-
4th	Bengal Warriors	20,00,000/-
