= Women's Kabaddi League =

Kabaddi league in India

- Most recent season or competition: 2023 Women's Kabaddi League
- Sport: Kabaddi
- Founded: 2023
- First season: 2023
- CEO: Dr. Seema
- COO: Narender Singh
- No. of teams: 8
- Venue: To be announced
- Most recent champion: Uma Kolkata (2023)
- Broadcaster: To be announced
- Related competitions: Pro Kabaddi League
- Website: https://www.indiawkl.com/

The Women's Kabaddi League (WKL) is a professional Indian kabaddi league for women which started in 2023. Its first season was contested by eight teams in Dubai, with Uma Kolkata beating Punjab Panthers in the final.

Its second season will be held in 2025 in India.

== Teams ==
Locations of the Women's Kabaddi League teams

There are eight teams in the WKL: Bengaluru Hawks, Delhi Durgas, Gujarat Angels, Haryana Hustlers, Great Marathas, Rajasthan Raiders, Telugu Warriors, and UP Ganga Strikers.

In season 1 of WKL, three teams including Delhi Dynamites, Uma Kolkata and Punjab Panthers featured, which were replaced by three new teams ahead of the announcement of the season 2.

The winning team earned ₹10,000,000 (US$100,000) while the runners-up team earned ₹5,000,000 (US$52,000).

== Season results ==
Teams	2023
Bengaluru Hawks	7th
Delhi Dynamites	4th
Great Marathas	5th
Uma Kolkata	6th
Haryana Hustlers	8th
Punjab Panthers	2nd
Rajasthan Riders	3rd
Gujrat Angels	1st

== See also ==
- Pro Kabaddi League – Professional men's kabaddi league in India
