= Vishal Bhardwaj (kabaddi) =

Indian kabaddi player

Personal information
- Nickname: Ankle-Assassin
- Nationality: Indian
- Born: 1 January 1997 (age 29)

Sport
- Country: India
- Sport: Kabaddi
Medal record
Men's kabaddi
Representing India
Asian Games
Gold medal – first place	2022 Hangzhou	Team
South Asian Games
Gold medal – first place	2019 Kathmandu	Team

Vishal Bhardwaj (born 1 January 1997) is an Indian professional Kabaddi player who plays in the Pro Kabaddi League. He is a defender who plays in the left corner. He is selected for the Indian team to represent at the 2022 Asian Games in Hangzhou, China. He is part of the Indian team that won the gold medal in the 2022 Asian Games. India defeated Iran 33-29 in a controversial final.

== Early life ==
Vishal hails from a middle-class family from Una district, Himachal Pradesh. His mother Anju is a home maker and he has one sister, Kanika. He is the first in the family to take up sports and he initially played basketball before switching to Kabaddi. After his junior days, he was selected for Telugu Titans in the PKL. He is nick-named as 'Ankle-Assassin' as he specialises in ankle-hold in the defence.

== Career ==
He played for Telugu Titans in the Pro Kabaddi League for three seasons. He captained the team in Season 6. He is part of the Indian team that won the gold in the final of the 2022 Asian Games.
