= Rajesh Narwal =

Indian kabaddi player

Personal information
- Nationality: Indian
- Born: 8 July 1990 (age 36) Haryana, India
- Height: 175 cm (5 ft 9 in)
- Weight: 81.7 kg (180 lb)

Sport
- Country: India
- Sport: Kabaddi
- Position: All-rounder
- Kabaddi: Pro Kabaddi League
- Club: Jaipur Pink Panthers; UP Yoddha
- Team: Dabang Delhi K.C
- Coached by: J. Udaya Singh

Rajesh Narwal is an Indian Kabaddi player.

== Career ==
=== Pro Kabaddi League ===
Rajesh Narwal played four seasons with Jaipur Pink Panthers and a title in the first season of Pro Kabaddi League. He was an essential part of their title-winning season where he played 60 games for the club. One of the top all-rounders in the league, he averages 4.43 raid points and 1.40 tackle points per match. A great asset defensively, Rajesh has converted 77 of his 183 tackles attempted. In the recent auction, he was sold to Team UP Yoddha for Rs. 69 lakhs. he scored 277 raid points and 100 tackle points he is third best all-rounder in pkl history. He currently is in the Dabangg Delhi K.C team.

In the 60 games he has played in the Pro Kabaddi League, he has received zero yellow or red cards till date, a notable statistic given the physicality of the sport of Kabaddi. Narwal does not rely purely on his Kabaddi career to sustain his family; he also works at ONGC in Sonipat.
