= Sandeep Kandola =

Indian Kabaddi player

Sandeep Kandola (Haryana) is an Indian Kabaddi player. He plays for Telugu Titans in Pro Kabaddi League.

He was again bought by Telugu Titans in PKL 8

In PKL 9 he was bought by the Gujarat Fortune Giants and Now He is Retired from PKL.
