= Pardeep Narwal =

Indian kabaddi player

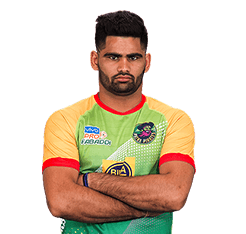
- Narwal in 2017

Personal information
- Full name: Pardeep Narwal.
- Nicknames: Dubki King, Record Breaker.
- Nationality: Indian
- Born: 16 February 1997 (age 29) Sonipat, Haryana, India
- Occupation: Kabaddi Player
- Years active: 2015-2025
- Height: 5.8(ft)in (178 cm)
- Weight: 75 kg (165 lb)
- Spouse: Swati Beniwal (2019)

Sport
- Sport: Kabaddi
- League: Pro Kabaddi League
- Team: Patna Pirates (2016-2019); UP Yoddhas (2021-2023); Bengaluru Bulls (2015, 2024-2025)
Medal record
Representing India
Asian Games
Bronze medal – third place	2018 Jakarta	Team
2016 Kabaddi World Cup
Gold medal – first place	2016 Ahmadabad	Team
Asian Kabaddi Championship
Gold medal – first place	2017 Gorgan	Team
2018 Dubai Kabaddi Masters
Gold medal – first place	2018 Dubai	Team
South Asian Games
Gold medal – first place	2016 Guwahati	Team
Gold medal – first place	2019 Kathmandu	Team

Pardeep Narwal (born 16 February 1997) is an Indian former international kabaddi player, who plays as a raider. Widely regarded as the greatest raider in kabaddi history, he led the Patna Pirates to three straight titles in Pro Kabaddi League and holds a multitude of the league's raiding records.

== Early life ==
Pardeep Narwal was born in Rindhana village of Haryana's Sonipat district, where he started playing kabaddi. He started learning Kabaddi when he was only 6 years old. He got picked for his school's Kabaddi team when he was just 11 years old. Later, at 12, he joined the Haryana Kabaddi Academy.

== Kabaddi career ==
Narwal made his debut in VIVO Pro Kabaddi with the Bengaluru Bulls against Patna Pirates in Season 2 and featured six times that campaign, scoring a total of nine raid points.

Narwal moved to the Patna Pirates in Season 3 and blossomed into one of the best raiders in the league. He scored his first career Super 10 in the Pirates' 29–25 victory over Puneri Paltan in Kolkata, where he led both sides in scoring with 11 points on the night Alongside Rohit Kumar, Narwal formed the league's most potent raiding duo as the two combined to score 194 raid points in the league stage of the campaign, with Kumar scoring 102 of those in 12 matches and Narwal scoring 92 raid points in 14 matches. Narwal scored his fifth Super 10 of the season against Puneri Paltan in the semi-final but missed on the final through injury. The Pirates, however, triumphed over defending U Mumba by a scoreline of 31-28 and won their maiden VIVO Pro Kabaddi title.

Following Rohit Kumar moves to the Bengaluru Bulls, Pardeep took over the responsibility of being the Pirates' lead raider and enjoyed another sensational campaign, scoring 107 raid points in 14 league stage matches with four Super 10s, the first of which came in narrow 36–34 win over U Mumba in Jaipur, where the raider scored, a match-high, 18 points. Narwal continued to carry the brunt of the raiding load in the playoffs and scored eight points in the Pirates' narrow 37–33 victory over Puneri Paltan in the semi-final, taking them to their second-straight VIVO Pro Kabaddi final. In the final against Jaipur Pink Panthers, Narwal unleashed a mammoth 16-point performance leading the Pirates to their second VIVO Pro Kabaddi title with a 37–29 victory and won their second VIVO Pro Kabaddi title in a row.

Narwal's third season with the Pirates was arguably the best ever by a player VIVO Pro Kabaddi history, as the raider notched up 369 raid points and led the league in every raiding category. Narwal scored a Super 10 in 19 off the 26 matches that he played in that campaign, managing one in each of Patna Pirates' first three matches. He followed it up with just one in the subsequent four matches but after that relatively lean patch, he embarked on a run of eight straight matches with a Super 10 that eventually ended against the Tamil Thalaivas where he fell just one point short of 10 raid points.

After finishing second in the Zone B standing, Narwal and the Pirates battled Haryana Steelers in the Playoffs, where the raider scored, a VIVO Pro Kabaddi record, 34 raid points which included an eight-point raid, as the Pirates routed the Steelers 69–30. In Eliminator 3, Narwal yet again led, scoring 19 raid points in his team's 42–32 win over Puneri Paltan. In Qualifier 2, Narwal scored 23 raid points against the Bengal Warriors in his team's narrow 47–44 victory, helping the Pirates reach their third straight VIVO Pro Kabaddi final. Narwal continued his form in the final, scoring 19 raid points against Gujarat Fortunegiants to lead the Pirates to a 55–38 victory and capture their third straight VIVO Pro Kabaddi title.

Narwal scored a Super 10 in each of his team's first three matches in Season 6 before falling short against the Telugu Titans. The next four matches also saw a similar trend for Narwal, as he scored three straight Super 10s before failing to do so against the same opponent in Patna. Narwal continued to string along quality performances but the Pirates struggled for form towards the latter end of the season and needed a big finish to their campaign to stand a chance to qualify for the Playoffs. Narwal scored three Super 10s in the Pirates final five matches of the season but the team failed to register a single win and crashed out in the league stage of the campaign for the first time in franchise history. This Season was also a very Interesting Season for him as he was battling against other raiders for the most Raid Points but came 2nd with 222 raid points, The third was Siddharth Desai (214) and The First Was Pawan Sehrawat (262) who was astounding for his Pro season.

In season 7, Narwal started slowly, but still became the first player to reach 1,000 points in the PKL.

In Pro Kabaddi League Season 9, he created a record as the first player in the league's history to score more than 1500 raid points in his PKL career. He set this record on 21 November 2022 at the Gachibowli Indoor Stadium, Hyderabad, playing against Gujarat Giants. He is the top scorer in history of Pro-Kabaddi League. He opened a Kabaddi academy for the bright future of Indian youngsters in kabaddi. The name of his Kabaddi Academy is Narwal Sports Academy. He is the most followed Kabaddi player on Instagram.

In Season 10 of Pro Kabaddi League, Pardeep Narwal set a record with 1600+ raid points, becoming the first player to achieve this on 11 December 2023, against the Bengaluru Bulls at Sri Kanteerava Indoor Stadium, Bengaluru.

International

Pardeep Narwal has featured regularly for the Indian kabaddi team since 2016 and has won gold in three of the four tournaments that he has played in.

Retirement

On 2 June 2025, Pardeep Narwal announced his retirement from kabaddi at the age of 28, after he went unsold in 2025 Pro Kabaddi League Auction.

== Honours ==
Patna Pirates

- Pro Kabaddi League: 2016 (January), 2016 (June), 2017

India

- Kabaddi World Cup: 2016
- Asian Kabaddi Championship: 2017
- Dubai Kabaddi Masters: 2018

Individual

- VIVO Pro Kabaddi Most Valuable Player (2016, 2017)
- Best Raider Award (2017, 2018)
- Most super raids in a season
- Most touch point in a single raid
- First player to score 1500 raid points in PKL history, it was against Gujarat Giants VS UP Yoddha Match PKL season 9. 8
- Holds the record for the most raid points in PKL history, with 1700+ raid points.
