= Rahul Chaudhari =

Indian kabaddi player

Rahul Chaudhary
Personal information
- Nickname: Raid Machine
- Nationality: Indian
- Born: 16 June 1993 (age 33) Jalalpur Choiya, Bijnor, Uttar Pradesh
- Occupation: Kabaddi Player
- Years active: 2010-present
- Height: 6 ft 0 in (183 cm)
- Spouse: Hetali Brahmbhatt (m. 2024)

Sport
- Country: India
- Sport: Kabaddi
- Position: Raider
- Kabaddi: Pro Kabaddi League
- Club: Jaipur Pink Panthers
- Team: India national kabaddi team

Rahul Chaudhari (born 16 June 1993) is an Indian Kabaddi player, who has played as a defender and later became a magnificent raider. He was the first player ever to score 500, 700 and 800 raid points in Pro Kabaddi League. He was a member of the Indian National Kabaddi team that won a gold medal in the 2016 South Asian Games. After six seasons with Telugu Titans and one season for Tamil Thalaivas, Rahul also played for Jaipur Pink Panthers before retiring from PKL in 2024.

== Early life ==
Chaudhari was born on born 16 June 1993 to Rampal Singh and comes from Jalalpur Choiya village in Bijnor district of Uttar Pradesh. He started playing Kabaddi at the age of 13 in 2006.

== Personal life ==
Chaudhary married Hetali in Ahmedabad on 8 December 2020.

== Career ==
=== Telugu Titans ===
Chaudhari scored 151 raid points in Season 1. In the second season, he scored 98 raid points and 9 tackle points, and the third season saw him score 87 raid points and with 12 tackle points with a 41.37% tackle success rate.

The Telugu Titans reached the semi-finals where they lost; Chaudhari took 14 raid points in the game. He was made captain of the Telugu Titans in Season 5, and finished the campaign with 193 points – 184 raid points and 9 tackle points.

For Season 6, Chaudhari was again bought by Telugu Titans for Rs 1,29,00,000, ending the season with 159 raid points and 7 tackle points.

==== Tamil Thalaivas ====
The Tamil Thalaivas bought Chaudhari for Season 7, bidding Rs 94,00,000 for him in the auction.

== Other activities ==
In July 2020, Chaudhary was made the brand ambassador of the Uttar Pradesh Dairy Department.

== Career Statistics ==
Updated as of 5 September 2026

Team	Season	League	Apps	Raid Points	Super 10s	Tackle Points	Total Points
Telugu Titans	2014	Pro Kabaddi League	14	151	8	10	161
Telugu Titans	2015	Pro Kabaddi League	14	98	5	9	107
Telugu Titans	2016 (Jan)	Pro Kabaddi League	13	87	4	12	99
Telugu Titans	2016 (Jun)	Pro Kabaddi League	16	146	7	4	150
Telugu Titans	2017	Pro Kabaddi League	22	184	8	9	193
Telugu Titans	2018–19	Pro Kabaddi League	21	159	4	7	166
Telugu Titans	Total		100	825	36	51	876
Tamil Thalaivas	2019	Pro Kabaddi League	22	130	4	8	138
Puneri Paltan	2021–22	Pro Kabaddi League	7	13	0	0	13
Jaipur Pink Panthers	2022	Pro Kabaddi League	21	71	2	2	73
Jaipur Pink Panthers	2023–24	Pro Kabaddi League	4	6	0	0	6
Jaipur Pink Panthers	Total		25	77	2	2	79
Career total			154	1045	42	61	1106

== Achievements ==
Jaipur Pink Panthers

- Pro Kabaddi League: 2022

Individual

- Most raid points: 2016 (Jun) Pro Kabaddi League
