= KBD Juniors =

Indian youth kabaddi competition

KBD Juniors is an Indian kabaddi competition for school children organised by Star Sports, the broadcast partner for Pro Kabaddi League (PKL). Three annual seasons have been held so far, starting in 2017.

== Format ==
Teams are drawn from the schools in each of the Indian cities which has a PKL team. Teams aim to be champions within their own city so that they can advance to the national stage of the competition.

Thousands of students participate in each edition.

=== Rules ===
Empty raids (raids where no points are scored) are not allowed.

== Results ==
South Point World School from Sonepat defeated Jeppiaar School 34–31 in the final of Season 1.

Sri Adishakti Higher Primary School defeated Delhi Public School 38–18 in the final of Season 2.

Mount Litera Zee School, Patna defeated Mother Khazani Public School, Delhi 42–32 in the final of Season 3.
