= Deepak Niwas Hooda =

Indian Kabaddi player

Personal information
- Full name: Deepak Niwas Hooda
- Nationality: Indian
- Born: 10 June 1994 (age 32) Chamaria, Rohtak District, Haryana
- Occupation: Kabaddi player
- Years active: 2014 – present

Sport
- Country: India
- Sport: Kabaddi
- Position: All-rounder
- League: PKL
- Club: Telugu Titans; Puneri Paltan; Jaipur Pink Panthers
- Team: India national kabaddi team
Medal record
Representing India
2016 Kabaddi World Cup
Gold medal – first place	2016 Ahmedabad	Team
2018 Asian Games
Bronze medal – third place	2018 Jakarta	Team
Asian Kabaddi Championship
Gold medal – first place	2017 Gorgan	Team
2018 Dubai Kabaddi Masters
Gold medal – first place	2018 Dubai	Team
South Asian Games
Gold medal – first place	2016 Guwahati	Team
Gold medal – first place	2019 Kathmandu	Team
- Updated on 18 March 2016

Deepak Ram Niwas Hooda (born 10 June 1994) is an Indian professional Kabaddi player and the former captain of India national kabaddi team. He was part of the Indian team which won gold medal at the 2016 South Asian Games. He has also featured in all the seasons of the Pro Kabaddi League. Deepak is regarded as one of the best all rounder in the Pro Kabaddi League history.

== Early life ==
Hooda was born in a farming family in the Chamaria Village of the Haryana's Rohtak district. He lost his mother when he was four year old. He started playing kabaddi in his village in 2009. He was studying in the twelfth grade when his father, Ram Nivas, demised in the 2013, which made him the sole breadwinner. Due to that, he had to leave his studies and become a part-time teacher. For the next two years, after completing his job at the school, he would go to other villages to practice kabaddi, which helped him improve his game immensely. He then pursued his graduation. There, he played at the All-India University tournament and won a gold medal. After that, he left his studies once again to pursue a career in kabaddi.

== Career ==
Hooda was part of the Haryana team that bagged gold at the Senior National level tournament in Patna in 2014. He made his debut for the national team at the 2016 South Asian Games, where his team won a gold medal.

=== Pro Kabaddi League ===
At the auction of the inaugural season of the Pro Kabaddi League in 2014, Hooda was a recipient of the second highest bid, having been bought for ₹12.6 lakh by the Telugu Titans. In 2016, after remaining part of the Telugu Titans for the first two seasons, Hooda joined the Puneri Paltan for the third and fourth seasons. In the third place play-off, Hooda top-scored with nine raid points for the Puneri Paltan, helping them to make a podium finish in the third season.

== Personal life ==
On 7 July 2022, Hooda married boxer Saweety Boora.
