= Sanjay Gupta (business executive) =

Indian business executive

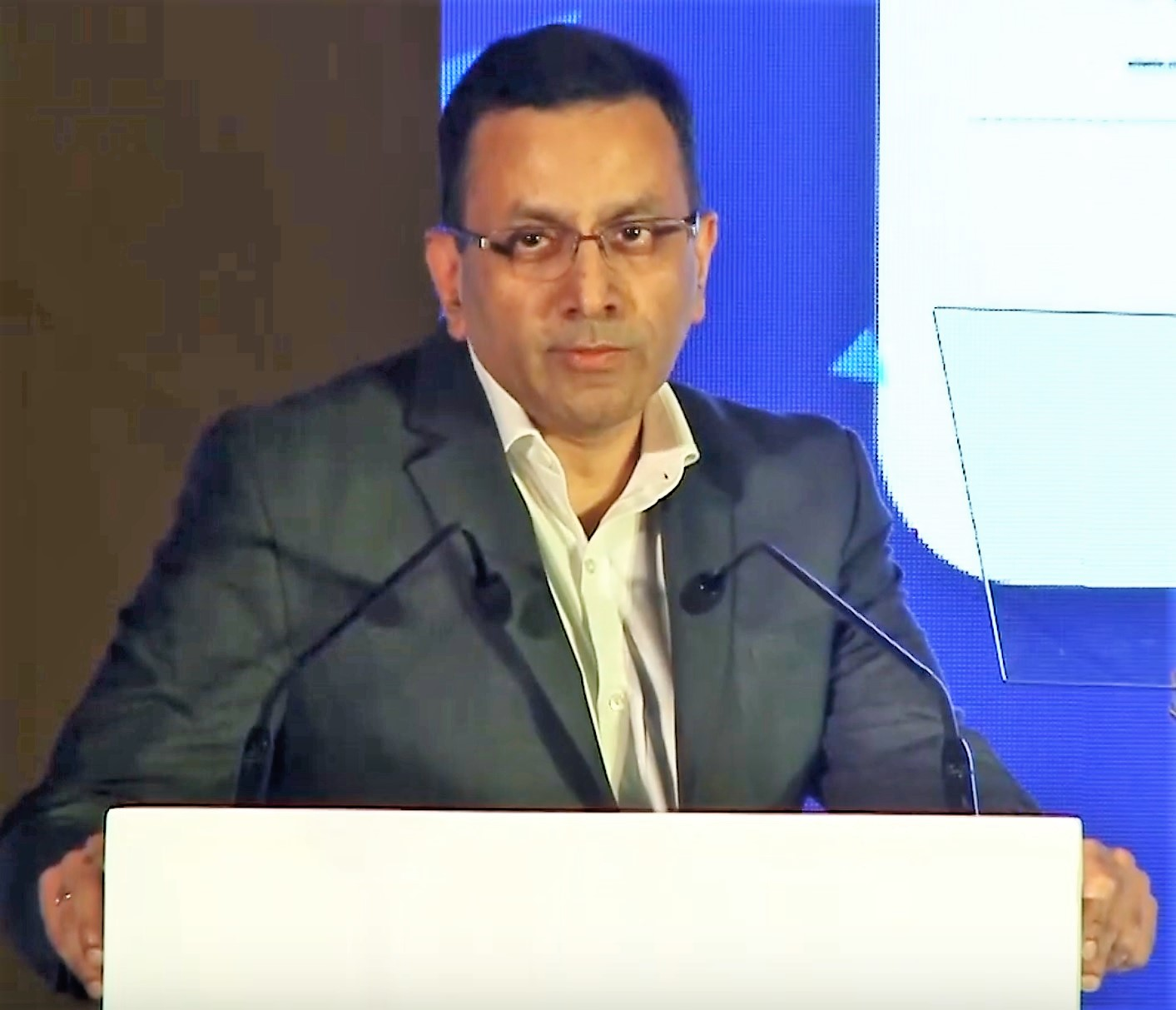
- Gupta in 2019
- Education: Delhi College of Engineering (BE); IIM Calcutta (MBA)
- Occupation: Business executive
- Title: Country Manager and President (Sales and Operations) of Google India

Sanjay Gupta is the President (sales and operations) of Google APAC. An alumnus of the Delhi College of Engineering and the Indian Institute of Management Calcutta, he has served as the managing director of Star India and The Walt Disney Company India, and country manager and vice president of Google India since November 2019.

== Education ==
Gupta pursued Bachelor of Engineering in mechanical engineering from the Delhi College of Engineering (now known as Delhi Technological University), following which he joined the research and development wing of Larsen & Toubro. He then completed his post-graduation from the Indian Institute of Management Calcutta (IIMC), Kolkata.

== Career ==
After completing his post-graduation from IIMC in 1991, Gupta joined Hindustan Unilever as a management trainee, and continued to work in the company for the next sixteen years. He became the area sales manager for the states of Bihar, Orissa (now known as Odisha), and West Bengal, and then handled various brands such as Close-Up, Lux, Vim, etc. He went on to become the head of the entire Hindustan Unilever portfolio for Western India.

Gupta worked at Bharti Airtel as the Chief Marketing Officer (Mobility), and left it to join Star India as its Chief Operating Officer in 2009. Google India's official statement, released when he joined them in 2019, credited Gupta with making Star's content available digitally through Hotstar, and for expanding its sports business by acquiring prime cricketing properties and launching the Pro Kabaddi League and Indian Super League. Gupta was appointed as the country manager and vice president (sales and operations) of Google India in November 2019.
