= Anup Kumar (kabaddi) =

Indian kabaddi player

Anup Kumar Yadav
Personal information
- Born: November 20, 1983 Palra, Gurgaon, Haryana, India
- Height: 1.83 m (6 ft 0 in)

Sport
- Sport: Kabaddi
- Position: Raider
- League: Pro Kabaddi League
- Team: U Mumba (2014-2019); Jaipur Pink Panthers (2019-2020)
Medal record
Representing India
World Cup
Gold medal – first place	2016 Ahmedabad	India
Asian Games
Gold medal – first place	2010 Guangzhou	India
Gold medal – first place	2014 Incheon	India
South Asian Games
Gold medal – first place	2006 Colombo	India
Gold medal – first place	2010 Dhaka	India
Gold medal – first place	2016 Guwahati & Shillong	India
- Updated on 11/02/2022

Anup Kumar is an Indian former professional Kabaddi player and Kabaddi Coach of PKL Team Patna Pirates . He was a member of the India national kabaddi team that won Asian gold medals in 2010 and 2014, one South Asian gold medal in 2016 and the 2016 Kabaddi World Cup. He was the captain of the Indian National Kabaddi Team. He spent five years with U Mumba and later moved to Jaipur Pink Panthers. In 2012, the Government of India conferred the Arjuna Award on him for his achievements in the sport. He is employed as a Deputy Commissioner of Police in his native State of Haryana. On 19 December 2018, he announced his retirement from kabaddi.

== Early life ==
Kumar, born and brought up in Palra, Gurgaon, Haryana, is the son of Ransingh Yadav, and Ballo Devi. He started playing Kabaddi as a pastime during his schooldays. In April 2005, he joined CRPF as a constable. He represented India for the first time at the 2006 South Asian Games in Sri Lanka.

== Pro Kabaddi League ==
=== U Mumba ===
==== 2014 ====
He was captain of the U Mumba team in the 2014 Pro Kabaddi League. He won the Most Valuable Player award in the first season of the league, leading his team to the finals where they lost to Jaipur Pink Panthers. He scored 155 raid points in 16 matches, to become one of the most successful raider of Pro Kabaddi.

==== 2015 ====
He led U Mumba to their maiden Pro Kabaddi title in 2015 in which he finished the season with 74 raid points. They defeated Bengaluru Bulls in the final.

==== 2016 ====
U Mumba reached the final where they lost against Patna Pirates by a margin of only 2 points. This was the third time when they played the final. A player in his team, Rishank Devadiga, got the award of the most valuable player.

He was retained by U Mumba team. After 3 seasons, the squad of U Mumba was mostly changed but once again with the help of Rakesh Kumar they managed to finish fifth in the season. This was the first season where U Mumba failed to reach the finals.

==== 2017 ====
Anup Kumar was retained by Mumba for the fifth consecutive season. In season 5, he became the first player in Pro Kabaddi to complete 400 raid points.

=== Jaipur Pink Panthers ===
==== 2018–19 ====
For the sixth season, Anup Kumar was released by his former franchise U Mumba. In the auctions, Abhishek Bachchan owned franchise Jaipur Pink Panthers brought him in the auction for 30 Lakhs INR.

=== Retirement ===
On 19 December 2018, he announced his retirement from kabaddi after completing 15 years in the sport.

== International career ==
He made his International debut in 2006 South Asian Games. Anup Kumar won gold medals at the 2010 Asian Games and the 2014 Asian Games in kabaddi.

He won a gold medal in kabaddi at the 2016 South Asian Games.

He captained the Indian national Kabaddi team and won their record third Kabaddi World Cup in 2016.

== Style of play ==
His main skills are bonus, hand touch and toe touch. Due to his extraordinary skills in earning bonus points, he is famously known as Bonus ka Badshah. He has another nickname 'Captain Cool' due to his brilliant captaincy and sportsmanship. He is widely regarded as one of the greatest captains in Indian Kabaddi history.

Though there was a decline in his performance at the final stages (during his last matches), he continued to influence by his captainship qualities.

== Honours and achievements ==
=== Club ===
==== U Mumba ====
- Pro Kabaddi League:
  - 2015 Pro Kabaddi League Champions with U Mumba as a captain.
  - 2014 Pro Kabaddi League- Raider of the season with 153 raid points from 16 matches

=== International ===
==== India ====
- Kabaddi World Cup: 2016
- Asian Games Gold Medal: 2010, 2014
- South Asian Games Gold Medal: 2016

=== Individual ===
==== Awards ====
- Pro Kabaddi League 2014: Most Valuable Player
- Arjuna Award: 2012
