= PO Surjeet Singh =

Indian kabaddi player

Surjeet Singh
Personal information
- Full name: Surjeet Singh
- Nationality: Indian
- Born: 10 August 1990 (age 36)
- Occupation: Kabaddi Player
- Height: 174 cm (5 ft 9 in)
- Weight: 83 kg (183 lb)

Sport
- Sport: Kabaddi
- Position: Defender, Right cover
- Kabbadi: Pro Kabaddi League
- Club: Dabang Delhi K.C.
- Coached by: Anup Kumar

PO Surjeet Singh (born 10 August 1990) is an Indian professional kabaddi player currently playing for Dabang Delhi K.C. in the VIVO Pro Kabaddi League. He plays in the Right Cover position. He specializes in blocking and dashing his opponents out of the mat.

== Career ==
=== Season 3 ===
Surjeet Singh played for the Puneri Paltan in his first edition of VIVO Pro Kabaddi League. He had a tackle strike rate of 64% in his debut season and helped Puneri Paltan reach the semifinals of PKL for the first time.

=== Season 4 ===
Surjeet played for the U Mumba in the fourth edition of VIVO Pro Kabaddi League. He had a tackle strike rate of 50.68% in the season. In 14 matches he scored 37 points.

=== Season 5 ===
Surjeet played for the Bengal Warriors in Season 5 of VIVO Pro Kabaddi. He had a tackle strike rate of 52.05% in the season. Surjeet had 9 High Five’s which were the joint most High Five’s in the season. He was also the captain of the Bengal Warriors side for the season.

=== Season 6 ===
Surjeet was the part of Bengal Warriors in sixth season of VIVO Pro Kabaddi League. He scored 57 point's in 23 matches with a tackle strike rate of 41.86%.

== Records and achievements ==
- VIVO Pro Kabaddi Champion (2016)
- 2016 Kabaddi World Cup winner
- Gold at 2017 Southeast Asian Games
- Gold at 2017 Asian Beach Games
