= Pro Kabaddi League =

Kabaddi tournament in India

- Country: India
- Administrator: Anupam Goswami
- First tournament: 2014
- Number of teams: 12
- Current champions: Dabang Delhi KC (2nd title)
- Most raid points: (India) Pardeep Narwal (1801)
- Most tackle points: (Iran) Fazel Atrachali (597)
- Website: ProKabaddi.com
- 2026 Pro Kabaddi League

The Pro Kabaddi League, abbreviated as PKL, is an Indian men's kabaddi league. It premiered in 2014 and airs on Star Sports. It is the most popular kabaddi league in the world and the second most watched sports league in India after the cricket league Indian Premier League.

Since its inception there have been eight different champions. Patna Pirates have won the league three consecutive times. Jaipur Pink Panthers and Dabang Delhi have won twice each, while U Mumba, Bengaluru Bulls, Bengal Warriorz, Puneri Paltan and Haryana Steelers have one title each. Dabang Delhi are the current champions after winning their second title in the 2025 edition.

== History ==
Season	Champions
2014	Jaipur Pink Panthers
2015	U Mumba
2016 I	Patna Pirates
2016 II	Patna Pirates (2)
2017	Patna Pirates (3)
2018-19	Bengaluru Bulls
2019	Bengal Warriors
2021-22	Dabang Delhi
2022	Jaipur Pink Panthers (2)
2023-24	Puneri Paltan
2024	Haryana Steelers
2025	Dabang Delhi (2)

The league's inception was influenced by the popularity of the kabaddi tournament at the 2006 Asian Games. The Pro Kabaddi League uses a franchise-based model and its first season was held in 2014 with eight teams each of which has paid fees of up to US$250,000 (₹20,00,000) to join.

There were doubts over whether the Pro Kabaddi League would be successful, noting that many leagues were attempting to emulate the IPL's business model and success and that, unlike cricket, there were relatively fewer well-known players in Kabaddi. However, it was also noted that kabaddi was widely played in grassroots community settings, and could thus attract a wide variety of rural and metropolitan viewers for advertisers to target if the league gained significant attraction.

The inaugural season was seen by 43.5 crores (435 million) viewers, second to the 2014 Indian Premier League's 55.2 crores (552 million), while the first season final between Jaipur Pink Panthers and U-Mumba was watched by 8.64 crores (86.4 million). Star Sports, the Pro Kabaddi League's broadcaster, subsequently announced in 2015 that it would acquire a 74% stake in the league's parent company Mashal Sports.

For the 2017 and 2018–19 season, the Pro Kabaddi League added four new teams, and changed its format to split the teams into two divisions known as "zones". Soon the league returned to its regular double round-robin format from the 2019 season.

The league won the Best Sports League at the Confederation of Indian Industry Sports Business Awards in 2024 at New Delhi.

== Format ==
The Pro Kabaddi League follows a round-robin format, where each team plays against 6 teams twice and 6 teams once during the league phase.

At the end of the league phase, the top 4 teams qualify for the playoffs, while the teams ranking from position 5 to 8 qualify for the play-ins. The playoffs and play-ins consist of eliminators and finals where teams compete to reach the ultimate final match. The team that wins the final is crowned the champion of the Pro Kabaddi League.

The league has various individual awards like the Most Valuable Player aka MVP, Best Raider, and Best Defender, among others, to recognize outstanding performances of players during the season.

== Seasons ==
=== Season 1 (2014) ===
The first signing and auction of players for the 8 teams were held on 20 May 2014 in Mumbai. India's national kabaddi captain Rakesh Kumar was the priciest among the players bought for ₹12.80 lakh by the Patna Pirates. Sports Authority of India's Deepak Niwas Hooda was bought by the Telugu Titans franchise for ₹12.60 lakh. Tae Deok Eom was the highest paid overseas player bought for ₹7 lakh by the Patna franchise.

The duration of the season was from 26 July 2014 to 31 August 2014. There were double round-robin matches along with two semifinals, third place and final games. 56 games were to be played in the first round and 4 in the playoff stage, making a total of 60 games. 8 teams took part in the first edition. The first game was played on 26 July between U Mumba and Jaipur Pink Panthers and the final was played on 31 August at Mumbai. Jaipur Pink Panthers beat U Mumba by 35–24 to win the inaugural Pro Kabaddi League.

=== Season 2 (2015) ===
Star Sports Pro Kabaddi season 2 was from 18 July 2015 to 23 August 2015. There were 60 matches played with two semifinals, a third-place play-off and a final. The first game was played on 18 July between U Mumba and Jaipur Pink Panthers and the final was played on 23 August at Mumbai between u Mumba and Bengaluru Bulls. U Mumba beat Bengaluru Bulls with the points 36–30 to win the 2015 season of the Pro Kabaddi League. U Mumba stood first, Bengaluru Bulls stood second and Telugu Titans stood in the third position in the league.

=== Season 3 (January 2016) ===
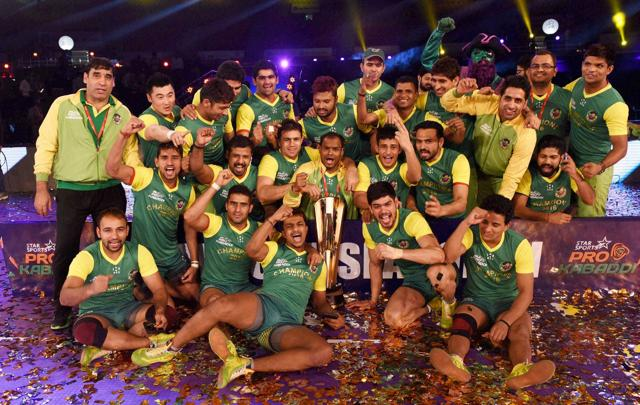
Patna Pirates winning moments (2016 edition)

Star Sports Pro Kabaddi season 3 had two editions. The CEO of Star India, Sanjay Gupta, confirmed that Star Sports Pro Kabaddi wants to make Pro Kabaddi, a 5-week event, happen 10 weeks a year by having two editions a year. The idea is to play the tournament once in January–February 2016 and once in June–July 2016. It also had 8 teams. Patna Pirates beat U Mumba by 3 points in the final in Delhi to take home the trophy. Puneri Paltan came third this season.

=== Season 4 (June 2016) ===
The fourth season took place from 25 June to 31 July 2016, with the existing eight teams participating. Patna Pirates beat Jaipur Pink Panthers in the final. Season 4 also saw the launch of the first professional women's kabaddi league, Women's Kabaddi Challenge (WKC). The first season saw 3 teams namely Ice Divas, Fire Birds and Storm Queens battle out to be the first-ever WKC champions. In the men's final, Patna Pirates defeated Jaipur Pink Panthers to win the Pro Kabaddi League title for the 2nd time.

=== Season 5 (2017) ===
The 2017 season was the fifth edition of the Pro Kabaddi League, and it featured 12 teams, including new teams from Uttar Pradesh, Haryana, Tamil Nadu, and Gujarat. The team from Haryana is known as Haryana Steelers owned by JSW Sports. Sachin Tendulkar co-owns the Tamil Nadu team named Tamil Thalaivas. The Uttar Pradesh team is named as UP Yoddha owned by GMR group and the Gujarat team is named as Gujarat Fortune Giants owned by Gautam Adani.

Auctions for the new season were held in May, before which the existing teams were allowed to retain one player each. The auction saw over 400 players go under the hammer and ₹46.99 crores spent by the 12 teams.

The Pro Kabaddi League season 5 started on 28 July 2017.

The most expensive pick of the auction was raider Nitin Tomar, who was bought by the Uttar Pradesh team for a sum of ₹93 lakh. Following in second place was Rohit Kumar after the Bengaluru Bulls picked him for an ₹81 lakhs price. The most expensive foreign player was South Korea's Lee Jang-kun after he was retained by the Bengal Warriors for ₹80.3 lakhs.

The new season was slated to be the biggest league tournament of its kind in the history of Indian sports in terms of geographical coverage and duration. It featured 138 matches spread across a time period of 13 weeks across 11 states.

A children's Kabaddi tournament, known as KBD Juniors, was also organised between schools of the cities in which the matches were held.

Patna Pirates beat Gujarat Fortune Giants by 55–38 in the final with the Man of the Tournament Pardeep Narwal stealing the show with 19 raid points against the Fortune Giants defence for the first time in the tournament.

The award ceremony of the finale was hosted by Pooja Bhamrah. Pardeep Narwal was adjudged the man of the finale.

=== Season 6 (2018) ===
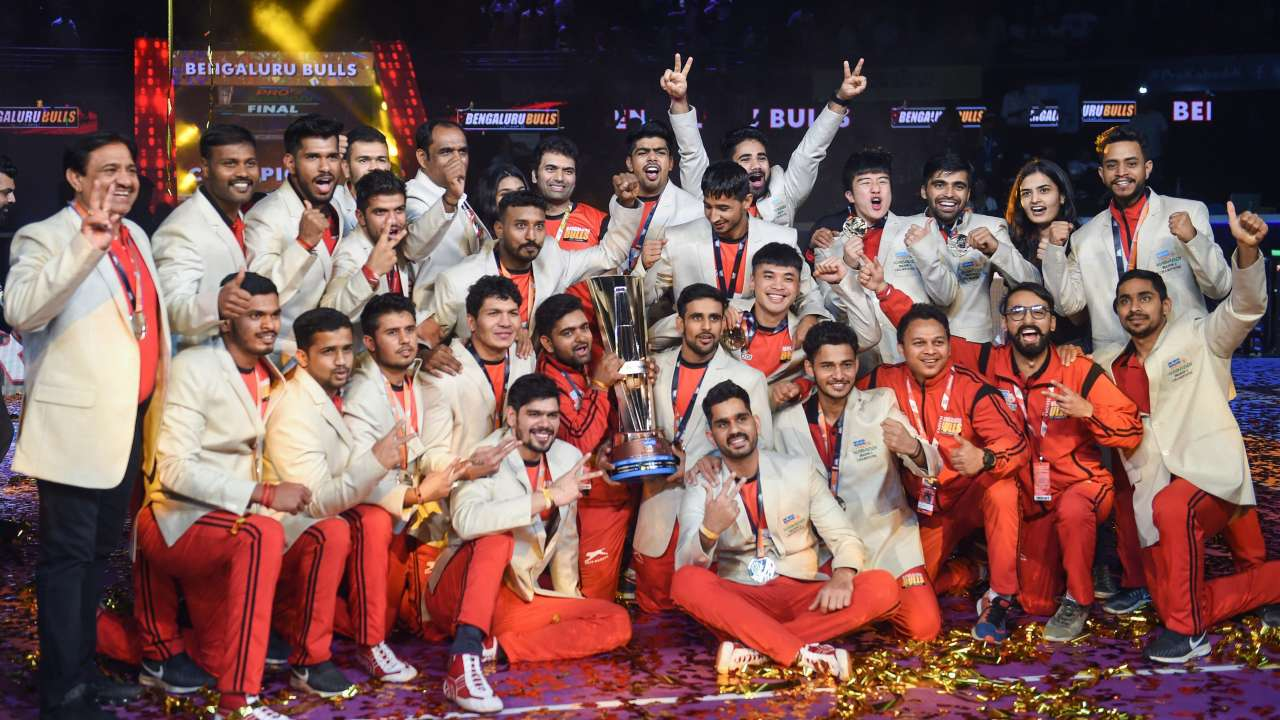
Bengaluru Bulls lifting the season 6 championship.

The 2018 season is the sixth edition of the Pro Kabaddi League, and it features 12 teams. Auctions for the new season were held in which Haryana Steelers paid ₹1.51 crores for Monu Goyat who became the highest paid player in the history of Pro Kabaddi league.

The most expensive foreign player this season is Fazel Atrachali from Iran. He was bought by U Mumba for ₹1 crore.

Zone B toppers, Bengaluru Bulls beat the Zone A toppers, Gujarat Fortune Giants by 38–33 in the final with the Man of the Tournament Pawan Kumar Sehrawat stealing the show with a record 22 raid points against the young Fortune Giants defence. For a consecutive second time, Gujarat Fortune Giants have lost in the finals. The coach of Bengaluru Bulls, Randhir Singh was happy as his team finally won the tournament after underwhelming finishes in the previous couple of seasons. On the other hand, Manpreet Singh, the coach of the Gujarat Fortune Giants rued the opportunity to win the tournament after losing two successive finals.

=== Season 7 (2019) ===
The 2019 season is the seventh edition of the Pro Kabaddi League, and it features 12 teams. Auctions for the new season were held in Mumbai on 8 and 9 April. The franchises splashed out over 50 crores to acquire 200 players. Siddharth Sirish Desai became the most expensive buy of the season after Telugu Titans got the winning bid of him at ₹1.45 crore. The most expensive foreign player of this season was Iranian Mohammad Esmaeil Nabibakhsh who was bought by Bengal Warriors for ₹77.75 lakh. As termed by the organisers 'Most Toughest Season', the zonal system present in the previous season is removed, and each team will play against all the other teams twice. Top 6 teams will qualify for the playoffs. The top two teams will automatically make the semi-finals while the remaining four will battle it out in eliminators. Dabang Delhi and Bengal Warriors emerged as the winners in the semi-finals and qualified to the final for the first time. In the final, Bengal Warriors outplayed Dabang Delhi by a margin of 39–34 and clinched their maiden Pro Kabaddi League title. The season witnessed several records. Pardeep Narwal became the first ever player to reach 1000 points in the Pro Kabaddi League. Naveen Kumar scored 21 consecutive Super 10s and overall 22. While Pawan Sehrawat registered most individual points in a match (39) against Haryana Steelers. In this season, for the first time three raiders crossed the 300-raid points mark. Among the defenders, Neeraj Kumar of Patna Pirates scored most tackle points (11) in a match and equalled the record of Mohit Chillar (11).

=== Season 8 (2021) ===
The 2021–22 season is the eighth edition of Pro Kabaddi League. The season began on 22 December 2021. The usual travelling caravan format was changed to a single venue hosting all the matches of the season. Kanteerava Indoor Stadium, Bangalore was initially announced as the venue, but was later changed to the Sheraton Grand Hotel and Convention Center located in Whitefield, Bangalore. Dabang Delhi beat Patna Pirates in final to win their maiden PKL title. Naveen Kumar from Delhi created history by winning 2 back to back MVP awards. Bengaluru skipper Pawan Sehrawat successfully defended his best raider crown and won the award for second season in a row. Sehrawat finished the campaign with 18 super raids and 304 raid points to his name. Iranian left corner, Mohammadreza chiyaneh from team Patna Pirates took the best defender award home for second season in a row. The rookie set a new PKL record with 10 High 5's and 89 tackle points. Mohit Goyat from pune was named the best new young player.

=== Season 9 (2022) ===
The 2022 season is the ninth edition of the Pro Kabaddi League. The auction for the season spanned 5–6 August 2022. The most expensive transfer of the season was Pavan Kumar Sehrawat, who was bought by Tamil Thalaivas for Rs 2.26 crore, a record sum for the PKL. The season began on 7 October 2022 and was held with the season divided into three legs, each taking place in a different venue (Kanteerava Indoor Stadium, Shree Shiv Chhatrapati Sports Complex and Gachibowli Indoor Stadium). Jaipur Pink Panthers beat Puneri Paltan 33–29 in the final to become the 2nd team after Patna Pirates to win more than 1 title of the Pro Kabaddi League.

=== Season 10 (2023) ===
The 2023 season is the tenth edition of the Pro Kabaddi League. The auction of season 10 The auction for originally scheduled for September 8 and 9 was postponed and rescheduled to October 9 and 10 due to Asian Games. The caravan format will be back for PKL 10, and all the 12 teams will travel to matches in the home cities. As the Season 10 auction drew to a close, Pawan Sehrawat emerged as the top participant. For ₹2.60 Cr, the Telugu Titans purchased him. The schedule for the tenth season of the Pro Kabaddi League has been made public. The event is planned to happen from December 2, 2023, and February 2024. The Telugu Titans and Gujarat Giants faced each other in the inaugural match of the Pro Kabaddi League and Gujarat Giants won that match. Final between Puneri Paltan and Haryana Steelers and Puneri Paltan won the final and their first trophy. Full-time points are Puneri Paltan 28-25 Haryana Steelers

=== Season 11 (2024) ===
The 2024 Pro Kabaddi League is the eleventh season of the Pro Kabaddi League, a franchise-based Kabaddi league in India. PKL auction was held in Mumbai on August 15 and 16. Raider Sachin Tanwar was made the most expensive player of the 2024 PKL auction, as he was bought for Rs. 2.15 crore by the Tamil Thalaivas on the first day of the season 11 auction. The season began on 18 October 2024.

On 28 December 2024, one day before the 2024 Pro Kabaddi League Final, the Pro Kabaddi League hosted the Pro Kabaddi League: Melbourne Raid at the John Cain Arena in Melbourne, Victoria, Australia. The Event featured two Kabaddi All Star Exhibition matches.

On 29 December 2024, Haryana Steelers defeated Patna Pirates in the final by 32–23 to win their maiden Pro Kabaddi League title.

=== Season 12 (2025) ===
The twelfth season of the Pro Kabaddi League began on 29 August 2025, with the Telugu Titans facing the Tamil Thalaivas at the Rajiv Gandhi Indoor Stadium in the opening match. Mohammadreza Shadloui, from Iran, made history in the PKL 2025 auction held in June by becoming the first player to receive bids exceeding 2 crore on three consecutive occasions.

In the final of PKL 12, Dabang Delhi K.C. won the second title by defeating Puneri Paltan.

== Viewership ==
As per the available data of the opening two weeks, Star Sports Pro Kabaddi viewership on TV increased by nearly 56% from the 2014 year's viewership. During the inaugural season, viewership was 43.5 crore (435 million) viewers, which was the second in India after the 56 crore (560 million) of IPL viewership. The online viewership also increased 1.3 crore unique visitors, which is 18.5 times than of last year's 7 lakh unique visitors. The third season which was flagged off on 30 January, recorded a surge in viewership with the opening week ratings 36 per cent higher than the week one viewership for its last season.

In 10th season of PKL, the viewership registered 17% growth over the 9th season. It recorded 38 billion minutes of watch time (15% over 9th season).

== Teams ==
Team	Colors	City	Stadium	Capacity
Bengal Warriorz		Kolkata, West Bengal	Netaji Indoor Stadium, Kolkata	15,000
Bengaluru Bulls		Bengaluru, Karnataka	Kanteerava Indoor Stadium, Bangalore	4,200
Dabang Delhi KC		New Delhi, Delhi	Thyagaraj Sports Complex, Delhi	4,494
Gujarat Giants		Ahmedabad, Gujarat	EKA Arena, Amdavad	4,000
Haryana Steelers		Panchkula, Haryana	Sports University of Haryana Stadium, Sonipat	2,000
Jaipur Pink Panthers		Jaipur, Rajasthan	Sawai Mansingh Indoor Stadium, Jaipur	2,000
Patna Pirates		Patna, Bihar	Patliputra Sports Complex, Patna	3,500
Puneri Paltan		Pune, Maharashtra	Shree Shiv Chhatrapati Sports Complex, Pune	4,200
Tamil Thalaivas		Chennai, Tamil Nadu	Jawaharlal Nehru Indoor Stadium, Chennai	5,000
Telugu Titans		Hyderabad, Telangana	G. M. C. Balayogi Indoor Stadium, Hyderabad	5,000
Telugu Titans		Visakhapatnam, Andhra Pradesh	Rajiv Gandhi Indoor Stadium, Visakhapatnam	10,000
UP Yoddhas		Lucknow, Uttar Pradesh	Babu Banarasi Das Indoor Stadium, Lucknow	5,000
U Mumba		Mumbai, Maharashtra	Sardar Vallabhbhai Patel Indoor Stadium, Mumbai	8,000

Note: Table list in alphabetical order.

== Editions and results ==
Season	Final				Total Teams	Best Raider	Best Defender	Most Total Points
Season	Winner	Result	Runner-up	Venue	Total Teams	Best Raider	Best Defender	Most Total Points
2014	Jaipur Pink Panthers	35–24; SD = 11; Report	U Mumba	National Sports Club of India, Mumbai	8	Anup Kumar	Manjeet Chhillar	Anup Kumar
2015	U Mumba	36–30; SD = 6 Report	Bengaluru Bulls	Sardar Vallabhbhai Patel Indoor Stadium, Mumbai	8	Kashiling Adake	Ravinder Pahal	Kashiling Adake
2016 I	Patna Pirates	31–28; SD = 3 Report	U Mumba	Indira Gandhi Arena, New Delhi	8	Pardeep Narwal	Manjeet Chhillar	Pardeep Narwal
2016 II	Patna Pirates	37–29; SD = 8 Report	Jaipur Pink Panthers	G. M. C. Balayogi Indoor Stadium, Hyderabad	8	Rahul Chaudhari	Fazel Atrachali	Rahul Chaudhari
2017	Patna Pirates	55–38; SD = 17; Report	Gujarat Fortune Giants	Jawaharlal Nehru Stadium, Chennai	12	Pardeep Narwal	Surender Nada	Pardeep Narwal
2018–19	Bengaluru Bulls	38–33; SD = 5 Report	Gujarat Fortune Giants	Sardar Vallabhbhai Patel Indoor Stadium, Mumbai	12	Pawan Sehrawat	Nitesh Kumar	Pawan Sehrawat
2019	Bengal Warriors	39–34; SD = 5 Report	Dabang Delhi	EKA Arena, Ahmedabad	12	Pawan Sehrawat	Fazel Atrachali	Pawan Sehrawat
2021–22	Dabang Delhi K.C.	37–36; SD = 1 Report	Patna Pirates	Sheraton Grand Whitefield, Bengaluru	12	Pawan Sehrawat	Mohammadreza Chiyaneh	Pawan Sehrawat
2022	Jaipur Pink Panthers	33–29; SD = 4 Report	Puneri Paltan	Sardar Vallabhbhai Patel Indoor Stadium, Mumbai	12	Arjun Deshwal	Ankush	Arjun Deshwal
2023–24	Puneri Paltan	28–25; SD = 3 Report	Haryana Steelers	G. M. C. Balayogi Indoor Stadium, Hyderabad	12	Ashu Malik	Mohammadreza Chiyaneh	Ashu Malik
2024	Haryana Steelers	32–23; SD = 9 Report	Patna Pirates	Shree Shiv Chhatrapati Sports Complex, Pune	12	Devank Dalal	Nitesh Kumar	Devank Dalal
2025	Dabang Delhi K.C.	31–28; SD = 3 Scorecard	Puneri Paltan	Thyagaraj Sports Complex, Delhi	12	Ayan Lohchab	Navdeep Singh	Ayan Lohchab

== Team performances ==
Season	I	II	III	IV	V	VI	VII	VIII	IX	X	XI	XII
Bengal Warriorz	7th	6th	4th	8th	3rd	6th	1st	9th	11th	7th	10th	12th
Bengaluru Bulls	4th	2nd	7th	6th	7th	1st	4th	3rd	3rd	8th	12th	5th
Dabang Delhi K.C.	6th	7th	8th	7th	12th	4th	2nd	1st	5th	5th	3rd	1st
Gujarat Giants	Team did not exist				2nd	2nd	9th	5th	8th	6th	11th	11th
Haryana Steelers	Team did not exist				5th	12th	5th	7th	7th	2nd	1st	7th
Jaipur Pink Panthers	1st	5th	6th	2nd	10th	10th	7th	8th	1st	4th	5th	6th
Patna Pirates	3rd	4th	1st	1st	1st	7th	8th	2nd	10th	3rd	2nd	4th
Puneri Paltan	8th	8th	3rd	3rd	4th	8th	10th	6th	2nd	1st	8th	2nd
Tamil Thalaivas	Team did not exist				11th	11th	12th	11th	4th	9th	9th	10th
Telugu Titans	5th	3rd	5th	4th	9th	9th	11th	12th	12th	12th	7th	3rd
U Mumba	2nd	1st	2nd	5th	8th	5th	3rd	10th	9th	10th	6th	8th
UP Yoddhas	Team did not exist				6th	3rd	6th	4th	6th	11th	4th	9th

=== Performance of all the teams in all seasons ===
Team	Played	Won	Loss	Draw	Win%	Loss%	Draw%	SD	Trophy
Bengal Warriorz	235	96	113	26	40.85%	48.08%	11.06%	-433	1
Bengaluru Bulls	242	107	121	14	44.22%	50%	5.78%	-30	1
Dabang Delhi	239	112	104	23	46.86%	43.52%	9.62%	-136	2
Gujarat Giants	179	84	79	16	46.93%	44.13%	8.94%	15	0
Haryana Steelers	180	95	72	13	52.78%	40%	7.22%	71	1
Jaipur Pink Panthers	238	118	101	19	49.58%	42.44%	7.98%	277	2
Patna Pirates	251	133	96	22	52.99%	38.25%	8.76%	395	3
Puneri Paltan	242	119	103	20	49.17%	42.56%	8.26%	305	1
Tamil Thalaivas	174	53	100	21	30.46%	57.47%	12.07%	-303	0
Telugu Titans	235	80	135	20	34.04%	57.45%	8.51%	-533	0
U Mumba	239	126	95	18	52.72%	39.75%	7.53%	245	1
UP Yoddhas	182	79	83	20	43.41%	45.60%	10.99%	-135	0
Last updated: 31 October 2025, As of Dabang Delhi K.C. vs Puneri Paltan

=== Team records ===
Record	First		Second		Third		Fourth		Fifth	
Most Matches Played	Patna Pirates	251	Bengaluru Bulls	242	Puneri Paltan	242	Dabang Delhi	239	U Mumba	239
Most Wins (Total)	Patna Pirates	133	U Mumba	126	Puneri Paltan	119	Jaipur Pink Panthers	118	Dabang Delhi	112
Most Defeats (Total)	Telugu Titans	135	Bengaluru Bulls	121	Bengal Warriors	113	Dabang Delhi	104	Puneri Paltan	103
Highest Win%	Patna Pirates	52.99	Haryana Steelers	52.78	U Mumba	52.72	Jaipur Pink Panthers	49.58	Puneri Paltan	49.17
Lowest Win%	Tamil Thalaivas	30.46	Telugu Titans	34.04	Bengal Warriors	40.85	UP Yoddhas	43.41	Bengaluru Bulls	44.22
Highest Defeat%	Tamil Thalaivas	57.47	Telugu Titans	57.45	Bengaluru Bulls	50	Bengal Warriorz	48.08	UP Yoddhas	45.60
Lowest Defeat%	Patna Pirates	38.25	U Mumba	39.75	Haryana Steelers	40	Jaipur Pink Panthers	42.44	Puneri Paltan	42.56

== Sponsorship ==
Period	Sponsor	Tournament
2013–16	(India) Star Sports	Star Sports Pro Kabaddi
2017–2022	(China) Vivo	Vivo Pro Kabaddi

== Team records ==
=== Total points scored ===
Rank	Team	Matches	Total points
1	Patna Pirates	229	8,089
2	Bengaluru Bulls	222	7,412
3	Puneri Paltan	221	7,384
4	Dabang Delhi	219	7,306
5	U Mumba	220	7,292
6	Jaipur Pink Panthers	218	7,208
7	Bengal Warriors	217	7,066
8	Telugu Titans	214	6,908
9	UP Yoddhas	164	5,666
10	Haryana Steelers	161	5,553
11	Gujarat Giants	161	5,374
12	Tamil Thalaivas	156	5,194
As of 29 December 2024.

=== Total points conceded ===
Rank	Team	Matches	Points Conceded
1	Patna Pirates	229	7,612
2	Bengaluru Bulls	222	7,517
3	Telugu Titans	214	7,502
4	Dabang Delhi	219	7,447
5	Bengal Warriors	217	7,373
6	Puneri Paltan	221	7,069
7	U Mumba	220	7,014
8	Jaipur Pink Panthers	218	6,860
9	UP Yoddha	164	5,605
10	Haryana Steelers	161	5,515
11	Tamil Thalaivas	156	5,432
12	Gujarat Giants	161	5,273
As of 29 December 2024.

=== Average points scored ===
Rank	Team	Matches	Average Points
1	Patna Pirates	229	35.32
2	UP Yoddhas	164	34.55
3	Haryana Steelers	161	34.49
4	Puneri Paltan	221	33.41
5	Bengaluru Bulls	222	33.39
6	Gujarat Giants	161	33.38
7	Dabang Delhi	219	33.36
8	Tamil Thalaivas	156	33.29
9	U Mumba	220	33.15
10	Jaipur Pink Panthers	218	33.06
11	Bengal Warriors	217	32.56
12	Telugu Titans	214	32.28
As of 29 December 2024.

=== Successful raids ===
Rank	Team	Matches	Successful Raids
1	Patna Pirates	229	3,707
2	Dabang Delhi	219	3,473
3	Bengaluru Bulls	222	3,404
4	Bengal Warriors	217	3,303
5	Jaipur Pink Panthers	218	3,262
6	Puneri Paltan	221	3,250
7	U Mumba	220	3,234
8	Telugu Titans	214	3,226
9	UP Yoddhas	164	2,541
10	Haryana Steelers	161	2,533
11	Gujarat Giants	161	2,427
12	Tamil Thalaivas	156	2,410
As of 29 December 2024.

=== Raid points ===
Rank	Team	Matches	Raid Points
1	Patna Pirates	229	4,662
2	Dabang Delhi	219	4,304
3	Bengaluru Bulls	222	4,295
4	Bengal Warriors	217	4,205
5	U Mumba	220	4,115
6	Telugu Titans	214	4,068
7	Jaipur Pink Panthers	218	4,036
8	Puneri Paltan	221	3,992
9	UP Yoddhas	164	3,257
10	Haryana Steelers	161	3,213
11	Gujarat Giants	161	3,050
12	Tamil Thalaivas	156	2,956
As of 29 December 2024.

=== Average raid points (teams) ===
Rank	Team	Matches	Average Raid Points
1	Patna Pirates	229	20.36
2	Haryana Steelers	161	19.96
3	UP Yoddhas	164	19.86
4	Dabang Delhi	219	19.65
5	Bengal Warriors	217	19.38
6	Bengaluru Bulls	222	19.35
7	Telugu Titans	214	19.01
8	Tamil Thalaivas	156	18.95
9	Gujarat Giants	161	18.94
10	U Mumba	220	18.7
11	Jaipur Pink Panthers	218	18.51
12	Puneri Paltan	221	18.06
As of 29 December 2024.

=== Successful tackles ===
Rank	Team	Matches	Successful Tackles
1	Puneri Paltan	221	2,224
2	Patna Pirates	229	2,172
3	U Mumba	220	2,096
4	Bengaluru Bulls	222	2,016
5	Jaipur Pink Panthers	218	2,007
6	Dabang Delhi	219	1,882
7	Telugu Titans	214	1,851
8	Bengal Warriors	217	1,836
9	Haryana Steelers	161	1,567
10	UP Yoddhas	164	1,521
11	Tamil Thalaivas	156	1,514
12	Gujarat Giants	161	1,508
As of 29 December 2024.

=== Tackle points ===
Rank	Team	Matches	Tackle Points
1	Puneri Paltan	221	2,419
2	Patna Pirates	229	2,383
3	U Mumba	220	2,299
4	Jaipur Pink Panthers	218	2,204
5	Bengaluru Bulls	222	2,201
6	Telugu Titans	214	2,051
7	Dabang Delhi	219	2,041
8	Bengal Warriors	217	1,990
9	Haryana Steelers	161	1,706
10	UP Yoddhas	164	1,681
11	Tamil Thalaivas	156	1,654
11	Gujarat Giants	161	1,630
As of 29 December 2024.

=== Average tackle points (team) ===
Rank	Team	Matches	Avg Tackle Points
1	Puneri Paltan	221	10.95
2	Haryana Steelers	161	10.6
2	Tamil Thalaivas	156	10.6
4	U Mumba	220	10.45
5	Patna Pirates	229	10.41
6	UP Yoddhas	164	10.25
7	Gujarat Giants	161	10.12
8	Jaipur Pink Panthers	218	10.11
9	Bengaluru Bulls	222	9.91
10	Telugu Titans	214	9.58
11	Dabang Delhi	219	9.32
12	Bengal Warriors	217	9.17
As of 29 December 2024.

=== Super raids ===
Rank	Team	Matches	Super Raids
1	Patna Pirates	229	173
2	Bengal Warriors	217	171
3	Bengaluru Bulls	222	166
4	Puneri Paltan	221	153
5	Jaipur Pink Panthers	218	148
6	Dabang Delhi	219	142
7	UP Yoddhas	164	138
8	Haryana Steelers	161	136
9	U Mumba	220	133
10	Telugu Titans	214	124
11	Gujarat Giants	161	120
12	Tamil Thalaivas	156	94
As of 29 December 2024.

=== Super Tackles ===
Rank	Team	Matches	Super Tackles
1	Patna Pirates	229	220
2	Telugu Titans	214	213
3	Jaipur Pink Panthers	218	212
4	U Mumba	220	210
5	Puneri Paltan	221	208
6	Bengaluru Bulls	222	197
7	UP Yoddhas	164	173
7	Dabang Delhi	219	173
9	Bengal Warriors	217	166
10	Haryana Steelers	161	144
11	Tamil Thalaivas	156	143
12	Gujarat Giants	161	129
As of 29 December 2024.

=== Most Do or Die raid points (teams) ===
Rank	Team	Matches	Points
1	Puneri Paltan	219	870
2	Patna Pirates	229	831
3	Jaipur Pink Panthers	214	766
4	U Mumba	218	719
5	Dabang Delhi	217	718
6	Bengal Warriors	215	712
7	Telugu Titans	214	697
8	Bengaluru Bulls	219	683
9	UP Yoddhas	164	553
10	Tamil Thalaivas	156	532
11	Gujarat Giants	161	521
12	Haryana Steelers	160	493
As of 29 December 2024.

=== Most all outs inflicted ===
Rank	Team	Matches	All Outs Inflicted
1	Patna Pirates	229	336
2	Puneri Paltan	221	287
3	Bengaluru Bulls	222	277
4	Jaipur Pink Panthers	218	276
5	Dabang Delhi	219	273
6	U Mumba	220	272
7	Bengal Warriors	217	246
8	Telugu Titans	214	224
9	UP Yoddhas	164	209
10	Gujarat Giants	161	202
11	Haryana Steelers	161	188
12	Tamil Thalaivas	156	171
As of 29 December 2024.

=== Most all outs conceded ===
Rank	Team	Matches	All Outs Conceded
1	Telugu Titans	214	310
2	Dabang Delhi	219	293
3	Bengaluru Bulls	222	291
4	Bengal Warriors	217	278
5	U Mumba	220	261
6	Puneri Paltan	221	260
7	Patna Pirates	229	252
8	Jaipur Pink Panthers	218	230
9	UP Yoddhas	164	206
10	Tamil Thalaivas	156	204
11	Haryana Steelers	161	197
12	Gujarat Giants	161	179
As of 29 December 2024.

== Player records ==
=== Total points (all seasons) ===
Rank	Player	Matches	Total Points	Points/match
1	(India) Pardeep Narwal	177	1980	9.80
2	(India) Maninder Singh	152	1,495	9.83
3	(India) Pawan Sehrawat	135	1,349	10.06
4	(India) Deepak Niwas Hooda	157	1,119	7.12
5	(India) Rahul Chaudhari	154	1,106	7.18
6	(India) Sachin Tanwar	137	1,075	7.85
7	(India) Arjun Deshwal	100	1,053	10.53
8	(India) Naveen Kumar	95	1044	10.98
9	(India) Vikash Kandola	124	833	6.71
10	(India) Ajay Thakur	120	816	6.75
As of 15 November 2024

=== Best raiders ===
==== Most raid points (all seasons) ====
Rank	Player	Matches	Raid Points	Raid points/match
1	(India) Pardeep Narwal	177	1,727	9.75
2	(India) Maninder Singh	152	1,481	9.74
3	(India) Pawan Sehrawat	135	1,281	9.48
4	(India) Arjun Deshwal	100	1,047	10.47
5	(India) Rahul Chaudhari	154	1,045	6.78
6	(India) Naveen Kumar	95	1,029	10.83
7	(India) Deepak Niwas Hooda	157	1020	6.49
8	(India) Sachin Tanwar	137	1014	7.40
9	(India) Vikash Kandola	124	810	6.53
10	(India) Ajay Thakur	120	794	6.62
As of 15 November 2024.

==== Most successful raids (all seasons) ====
Rank	Player	Matches	Successful Raids	Successful raids/match
1	(India) Pardeep Narwal	170	1,279	7.52
2	(India) Maninder Singh	143	1,111	7.76
3	(India) Pawan Sehrawat	126	921	7.30
4	(India) Rahul Chaudhari	154	859	8.57
5	(India) Naveen Kumar	91	843	9.26
6	(India) Deepak Niwas Hooda	157	835	5.31
7	(India) Sachin Tanwar	128	785	6.13
8	(India) Arjun Deshwal	91	754	8.28
9	(India) Ajay Thakur	120	643	5.35
10	(India) Vikash Kandola	120	638	5.31
As of 29 February 2024.

==== Average raid points ====
Rank	Player name	Current team	Matches	Average Raid Points
1	(India) Naveen Kumar	Dabang Delhi	91	11.04
2	(India) Arjun Deshwal	Jaipur Pink Panthers	91	10.41
3	(India) Maninder Singh	Bengal Warriors	143	9.99
4	(India) Pardeep Narwal	Retired	170	9.94
5	(India) Narender Kondola	Tamil Thalaivas	44	9.75
6	(India) Pawan Sehrawat	Telugu Titans	126	9.44
7	(India) Siddharth Sirish Desai	Haryana Steelers	79	8.72
8	(India) Nitin Kumar	Bengal Warriors	20	8.45
9	(India) Parteek Dahiya	Gujarat Giants	39	7.9
10	(India) Bharat	Bengaluru Bulls	64	7.77
As of 29 February 2024.

==== Most super raids ====
Rank	Player name	Current team	Matches	Super Raids
1	(India) Pardeep Narwal	Retired	170	75
2	(India) Maninder Singh	Bengal Warriors	143	47
3	(India) Pawan Sehrawat	Telugu Titans	126	34
4	(India) Siddharth Sirish Desai	Haryana Steelers	79	25
4	(India) Rishank Devadiga	Bengal Warriors	122	25
4	(India) Rahul Chaudhari	Jaipur Pink Panthers	154	25
7	(India) Vikash Kandola	Bengaluru Bulls	120	24
8	(India) Kashiling Adake	Bengaluru Bulls	92	23
8	(India) Ajay Thakur	Dabang Delhi	120	23
8	(India) Deepak Niwas Hooda	Bengal Warriors	157	23
As of 22 February 2024.

==== Most Do or Die raid points ====
Rank	Player name	Current team	Matches	Points
1	(India) Sachin Tanwar	Patna Pirates	128	233
2	(India) Deepak Niwas Hooda	Bengal Warriors	157	209
3	(India) Pardeep Narwal	Retired	170	202
4	(India) Maninder Singh	Bengal Warriors	143	178
5	(India) Rahul Chaudhari	Jaipur Pink Panthers	154	175
6	(India) Ajay Thakur	Dabang Delhi	120	163
7	(India) Shrikant Jadhav	Bengal Warriors	135	142
8	(India) Vikash Kandola	Bengaluru Bulls	120	138
9	(India) Ajinkya Pawar	Tamil Thalaivas	92	136
10	(India) Arjun Deshwal	Jaipur Pink Panthers	91	129
10	(India) Rishank Devadiga	Bengal Warriors	122	129
As of 29 February 2023.

==== Most Super 10s (all seasons) ====
Rank	Player name	Current team	Matches	Super 10s	Matches/super 10s
1	(India) Pardeep Narwal	Retired	170	85	2
2	(India) Maninder Singh	Bengal Warriors	143	72	1.98
3	(India) Naveen Kumar	Dabang Delhi	91	63	1.44
4	(India) Pawan Sehrawat	Telugu Titans	126	62	2.03
5	(India) Arjun Deshwal	Jaipur Pink Panthers	91	53	1.71
6	(India) Rahul Chaudhari	Jaipur Pink Panthers	154	42	3.66
7	(India) Sachin Tanwar	Patna Pirates	128	36	3.55
8	(India) Deepak Niwas Hooda	Bengal Warriors	157	35	4.48
9	(India) Siddharth Sirish Desai	Haryana Steelers	79	34	2.32
10	(India) Vikash Kandola	Bengaluru Bulls	120	30	4
As of 29 February 2024.

=== Fastest to multiples of 500 raid points ===
Raid points	Raider	Team	Matches
500	Naveen Kumar	Haryana Steelers	47
1,000	Naveen Kumar	Haryana Steelers	90
1,500	Pardeep Narwal	Retired	147

=== Best defenders ===
==== Most tackle points (all seasons) ====
Rank	Player	Current team	Matches	Tackle Points	Points/match
1	(Iran) Fazel Atrachali	Dabang Delhi K.C.	200	524	2.9
2	(India) PO Surjeet Singh	Dabang Delhi K.C.	162	429	2.72
3	(India) Manjeet Chillar		132	391	2.96
4	(India) Nitesh Kumar	Bengal Warriors	141	378	2.46
5	(India) Sunil Kumar	U Mumba	151	366	2.30
6	(India) Girish Maruti Ernak	U Mumba	147	362	2.71
7	(India) Sandeep Narwal		156	360	2.73
8	(India) Ravinder Pahal		124	339	2.45
9	(India) Parvesh Bhainswal	U Mumba	118	330	2.74
10	(India) Sandeep Dhull	Telugu Titans	118	328	2.77
As of 29 February 2024.

==== Most successful tackles (all seasons) ====
Rank	Player	Current team	Matches	Successful Tackles	Points/match
1	(Iran) Fazel Atrachali	[Dabang Delhi K.C.]	169	458	2.71
2	(India) PO Surjeet Singh	Dabang Delhi K.C.	148	379	2.56
3	(India) Manjeet Chillar	|[]| 132	374	2.83	
4	(India) Girish Maruti Ernak	[]	147	346	2.35
5	(India) Sandeep Narwal	[]	156	330	2.11
6	(India) Nitesh Kumar	[]	129	323	2.50
7	(India) Ravinder Pahal	[]| | 124	320	2.58	
8	(India) Sunil Kumar	U Mumba	137	314	2.29
9	(India) Sandeep Dhull	Telugu Titans	118	305	2.58
10	(India) Vishal Bhardwaj	Puneri Paltan	118	288	2.44
As of 29 February 2024.

==== Average tackle points ====
Rank	Player	Current team	Matches	Average Tackle Points
1	(Iran) Mohammadreza Chiyaneh	Puneri Paltan	68	4
2	(India) Ankush	Jaipur Pink Panthers	46	3.46
3	(India) Yogesh	Dabang Delhi	23	3.22
4	(India) Sagar	Tamil Thalaivas	70	3.19
5	(India) Manjeet Chillar	Dabang Delhi	132	2.96
6	(India) Rinku	U Mumba	50	2.94
7	(India) Sombir	Gujarat Giants	15	2.93
8	(Iran) Fazel Atrachali	Gujarat Giants	169	2.88
9	(India) Ankit	Patna Pirates	23	2.87
10	(India) Jaideep Dahiya	Haryana Steelers	66	2.85
10	(India) Sumit	UP Yoddhas	89	2.85
As of 2 March 2024.

==== Most Super Tackles (all seasons) ====
Rank	Player	Current team	Matches	Super Tackles
1	(India) Vishal Bharadwaj	Puneri Paltan	118	36
2	(India) Mahender Singh	U Mumba	126	32
3	(India) Parvesh Bhainswal	Telugu Titans	137	31
4	(India) Sandeep Narwal	UP Yoddhas	156	30
5	(Iran) Fazel Atrachali	Gujarat Giants	169	28
6	(India) Nitesh Kumar	UP Yoddhas	129	27
7	(India) Dharmaraj Cheralathan	Jaipur Pink Panthers	123	25
7	(India) PO Surjeet Singh	Bengaluru Bulls	148	25
9	(India) Sagar	Tamil Thalaivas	70	24
9	(India) Sombir	Gujarat Giants	94	24
As of 29 February 2024.

==== Most high 5s ====
Rank	Player name	Position	Current team	Matches	High 5s	Match/high 5s
1	(India) PO Surjeet Singh	Defender, right cover	Bengaluru Bulls	148	34	4.35
2	(Iran) Fazel Atrachali	Defender, left corner	Gujarat Giants	169	29	5.82
3	(Iran) Mohammadreza Chiyaneh	All Rounder	Puneri Paltan	67	27	2.48
4	(India) Manjeet Chillar	All Rounder	Dabang Delhi	132	25	5.28
5	(India) Girish Maruti Ernak	Defender, left corner	U Mumba	147	24	6.08
6	(India) Ravinder Pahal	Defender, right corner	Telugu Titans	124	23	5.39
6	(India) Nitesh Kumar	Defender	UP Yoddhas	129	23	5.60
8	(India) Surender Nada	Defender, left corner	Bengal Warriors	102	21	4.85
8	(India) Vishal Bhardwaj	Defender	Dabang Delhi	118	21	5.61
8	(India) Sandeep Dhull	Defender	Telugu Titans	118	21	5.61
As of 29 February 2024.

==== Most Matches Played ====
Rank	Player name	Current team	Matches
1	(Iran) Fazel Atrachali	Dabang Delhi	200
2	(India) Pardeep Narwal	Retired	170
3	(India) Deepak Niwas Hooda	Bengal Warriors	157
4	(India) Ran Singh	Bengaluru Bulls	156
4	(India) Sandeep Narwal	UP Yoddhas	156
6	(India) Rahul Chaudhari	Jaipur Pink Panthers	154
7	(India) PO Surjeet Singh	Jaipur Pink Panthers	148
8	(India) Girish Maruti Ernak	U Mumba	147
9	(India) Maninder Singh	Bengal Warriors	143
10	(India) Ravi Kumar	Gujarat Giants	141
As of 9th October 2025.

== Prize money ==
Prize money for the winner of season 6 was ₹3 crore. The first and second runners-up were awarded ₹1.80 crore and ₹1.20 crore respectively. The consolidated prize money for season 7 was ₹8 crore. The champions of season 7 bagged ₹3 crore while the runners-up received ₹1.8 crore. The losing semifinalists received ₹90 lakh each and, the fifth and the sixth-placed teams earned ₹45 lakh.

== See also ==
- Sports in India
- Women's Kabaddi League
- Ultimate Kho Kho
