= Dharmaraj Cheralathan =

Indian Kabaddi player

Personal information
- Nickname: Anna
- Nationality: Indian
- Citizenship: Indian
- Born: 21 April 1975 (age 51) Thiruchanampondi, Tamil Nadu
- Occupation: Kabbadi Player
- Years active: 1989 – present
- Height: 175 cm (5 ft 9 in)
- Weight: 78.6 kg (173 lb)

Sport
- Sport: Kabaddi
- Position: Defender Left and right corner
- League: Pro Kabaddi League
- Club: Haryana Steelers, Telugu Titans, Bengaluru Bulls, Patna Pirates, Puneri Paltan, U Mumba
- Team: India national kabaddi team
Medal record
Representing India
2016 Kabaddi World Cup
Gold medal – first place	2016 Ahmedabad	Team

Dharmaraj Cheralathan (born 21 April 1975) is an Indian Kabaddi player who currently represents Tamil Thalaivas in the VIVO Pro Kabaddi league. He was a member of the Indian Kabaddi team that won gold at the Kabaddi World Cup in 2016. Nicknamed “Anna”, Cheralathan led Patna Pirates to the Pro Kabaddi league in Season 4.

== Early life ==
Cheralathan comes from a farming family in Tamil Nadu. He has one brother and two sisters. According to him, farming was all that was important to him while growing up. Even his brother is a farmer. They spent a lot of their young days working in the fields. Cheralathan's brother, D. Gopu, has also played in the Pro Kabaddi league and was a defender for Tamil Thalaivas in Season 6.

== Career ==
=== Season 1 ===
Cheralathan played for Bengaluru Bulls in the inaugural season and scored 39 tackle points as well as 13 raid points. He had a tackle strike rate of 56.52% and was a nightmare for opposition raiders to deal with.

=== Season 2 ===
With 42 tackle points, Cheralathan led the Bengaluru Bulls defence in the second season. He also contributed in attack with 19 raid points. His tackle strike rate of 61.76% is impressive, but what stood out from this season was his success while raiding.

=== Season 3 ===
He was bought by Telugu Titans for the subsequent season and scored 31 tackle points for the side from Hyderabad. Despite a slight dip in his tackle success rate, Cheralathan still averaged a tackle strike rate of more than 50%.

=== Season 4 ===
Patna Pirates roped in Cheralathan ahead of the fourth season for Rs 29 lakh and appointed him as captain. He scored 39 tackle points and was rock-solid in defence as the Pirates made it back-to-back league titles. Cheralathan also topped the Super Tackles chart in the fourth season with 8 to his name.

=== Season 5 ===
He moved to Puneri Paltan for the following edition and only managed to score 25 tackle points with the Pune-based side. Cheralathan played 18 games for Pune but couldn't score more than 4 points in any of those contests.

=== Season 6 ===
After joining U Mumba in 2018, Cheralathan enjoyed a renaissance and scored an impressive 40 tackle points. He had a tackle strike rate of 57.97% and produced a defensive masterclass during U Mumba's win over Gujarat Fortunegiants in Delhi. Cheralathan's High 5 on the night against Season 6's finalists helped his side secure a victory.

International

A member of the Kabaddi Hall of Fame, Cheralathan holds nine gold medals from events such as the Kabaddi National Championship, the 2017 Southeast Asian Games and the Asian Beach Games.

== Records and achievements ==
- VIVO Pro Kabaddi Champion (2016)
- 2016 Kabaddi World Cup winner
- Gold at 2017 Southeast Asian Games
- Gold at 2017 Asian Beach Games
