= Surender Nada =

Indian kabaddi player

Personal information
- Nationality: Indian
- Born: 1987 or 1988 (age 37–38) Ahri village, Jhajjar district, Haryana, India
- Occupation(s): CISF, DSP

Sport
- Country: India
- Sport: Kabaddi
- Position: Defender, Left Corner
- League: Pro Kabaddi League
- Club: U Mumba(2014–2016); Bengaluru Bulls(2016); Haryana Steelers(2017–2018, 2021); Patna Pirates(2019); Bengal Warriors(2022–present)
- Team: India national kabaddi team
- Coached by: E Baskaran, Rambir Singh Khokhar
Medal record
Representing India
Kabaddi World Cup
Winner	2016 Kabaddi World Cup
Asian Kabaddi Championship
Gold medal – first place	2017 Gorgan	Team
2018 Dubai Kabaddi Masters
Gold medal – first place	2018 Dubai	Team
South Asian Games
Gold medal – first place	2019 Kathmandu	Team

Surender Nada (born 1987 or 1988) is an Indian professional Kabaddi player. He was part of the 2016 Kabaddi World Cup winning team. He currently plays as a defender for the Bengal warriors franchise of Pro Kabaddi League.

== Pro Kabaddi League ==
Surender started playing Kabaddi in the left corner for the franchise U Mumba in Season 1 of the Pro Kabaddi League.

He represented the Indian National Team in the 2016 Kabaddi World Cup held in Ahmedabad. He, along with his partner, right corner Mohit Chhillar, have since remained the first choice players for the national team in their respective positions. The two have gained a reputation as the most lethal left-right corner combo in the sport of Kabaddi which are the most important positions in the defensive set-up and strategy.

In Season 5 of Pro Kabaddi League, he was selected by the new franchise, Haryana Steelers, and offered him the captaincy.

He is consistently ranked among the Top Ten Defenders in all seasons of Pro Kabaddi league. In Season 1, he scored 51 tackle points in 15 games. In Season 5, he top scored with 80 tackle points in 22 matches.

In 2019, Nada was bought by Patna Pirates for 77 lakhs. In 2021, he was back in Haryana Steelers.
