= Manjeet Chhillar =

Indian professional kabaddi player

Personal information
- Nicknames: One Man Army, Angry Young Man, Mighty Manjeet, Powerhouse
- Nationality: Indian
- Born: 18 August 1986 (age 40) Nizampur, Delhi, India
- Occupation: Railways employee
- Height: 1.73 m (5 ft 8 in)
- Weight: 82 kg (181 lb)

Sport
- Country: India
- Sport: Kabaddi
- Position: All-rounder
- League: Pro Kabaddi League
- Club: Bengaluru Bulls (2014-2015) Puneri Paltan (2016-2017); Jaipur Pink Panthers (2017); Tamil Thalaivas (2018-2020) Dabang Delhi (2021)
- Team: India national kabaddi team
Medal record
Representing India
Asian Games
Gold medal – first place	2010 Guangzhou	Team
Gold medal – first place	2014 Incheon	Team
Kabaddi World Cup
Winner	2016 Kabaddi World Cup
2018 Dubai Kabaddi Masters
Winner	2018 Dubai	Team

Manjeet Chhillar (born 18 August 1986) is an Indian former professional kabaddi player who currently serves as the assistant coach of the Telugu Titans. He is widely regarded as one of the greatest kabaddi players of all time. During his professional career, he played for the Indian national team and won a gold medal at the 2014 Asian Games and 2014 Asian Indoor Games in Incheon. He also played for teams in the Pro Kabaddi League including the Bengaluru Bulls, Puneri Paltan, Jaipur Pink Panthers, Tamil Thalaivas, and Dabang Delhi. The Government of India conferred the Arjuna Award on him for his achievements in sports. In an exclusive chat with NNIS Sports, Chhillar termed it a 'dream' to receive the prestigious award. He was also a member of the state team of Haryana and is on top of Pro Kabaddi's all-time leaderboards for tackle points (391), successful tackles (374) and High 5s (25).

== Early life ==
He was born in Nizampur village in West Delhi near Ghevra metro station. Manjeet Chhillar was initially a wrestler, but an injury to his nose saw him return to his village where he started playing Kabaddi. Manjeet was first seen in professional Kabaddi in the 2010 Asian Games in China.

== Pro Kabaddi League ==
=== Season 1 ===
He was the captain of Bengaluru Bulls in the first season of VIVO Pro Kabaddi and won them a grand total of 51 tackle points – the highest by any defender – to emerge as the Star Sports Defender of the Tournament. Manjeet's versatility meant that he also picked up 71 raid points and helped the Bulls reach the semi-finals.

=== Season 2 ===
Manjeet was adjudged Most Valuable Player (MVP) in Season 2 for his all-round performance. He picked up 40 tackle points and 67 raid points as Bengaluru Bulls finished as runners-up. Like the first season, Manjeet contributed heavily in attack for Bengaluru. Having said that, his defensive displays were top class as well and justifies him being MVP in Season 2.

=== Season 3 ===
He moved to Puneri Paltan ahead of the third season and was made captain. His performance levels though didn't drop as he scored 61 tackle points and 45 raid points while leading Pune to a third-placed finish in what was their best season.

=== Season 4 ===
The fourth edition of Pro Kabaddi saw both Manjeet and Pune fail to better their performance from the previous campaign. He scored only 44 tackle points and 24 raid points as Pune narrowly missed out on the playoffs.

=== Season 5 ===
In Season 5, Manjeet joined Jaipur Pink Panthers and was made captain again. However, he could manage just 5 raid points and 47 tackle points as the Panthers endured a difficult campaign that saw Manjeet nurse an injury for a long duration.

=== Season 6 ===
In Season 6, he moved to Tamil Thalaivas after the Tamil Nadu-based franchise picked him. Manjeet became a leader in defence for the Thalaivas and scored 59 tackle points as well as 8 raid points.

=== Season 7 ===
In season 7, Manjeet continued at Tamil Thalaivas, scoring 37 tackle points and 4 raid points.

=== Season 8 ===
Manjeet was bought by Dabang Delhi in the auction for Rs 20 lakh and helped the team win its maiden title. In season 8, he scored 52 tackle points from 24 games.

At the end of the season, he retired and became the assistant coach of Telugu Titans.

== International ==
Manjeet is a gold medalist in the National Championships in 2010, 2011 and 2012. He has also won gold at the 2009 Asian Indoor Games and the 2010 Asian Games. Manjeet claimed bronze at the 2012 Asian Beach Games.

== Records and achievements ==
- Most Valuable Player (2015) in the PKL
- Gold at 2010 Asian Games in Guangzhou
- Gold at 2014 Asian Games in Incheon
- 2016 Kabaddi World Cup winner
- 2018 Dubai Kabaddi Masters winner
- Arjuna Award winner (2015)
