= Sardar Vallabhbhai Patel Indoor Stadium =

Sports venue in Mumbai, India

Dome Sardar Vallabhbhai Patel Indoor Stadium
- Interactive map of Dome Sardar Vallabhbhai Patel Indoor Stadium
- Full name: Sardar Vallabhbhai Patel Indoor Stadium
- Former names: National Sports Club of India Stadium
- Location: Lala Lajpatrai Marg, Lotus Colony, Worli, Mumbai – 400018
- Coordinates: 18.9865°N 72.8157°E
- Owner: Dome Entertainment Pvt. Ltd.
- Operator: Dome Entertainment Pvt. Ltd.
- Capacity: 6,000+
- Field size: 60m radius

Construction
- Groundbreaking: 1950
- Built: 1957
- Opened: 1957
- Renovated: 2004

Tenants
- Mumbai Masters (2013–present); U Mumba (2014–present)

The Dome Sardar Vallabhbhai Patel Indoor Stadium is an indoor sports arena, in Mumbai, Maharashtra. The facility seats 6,000+ people. Originally an outdoor stadium, it was established in 1957 and the foundation stone was laid by the former Chief Minister of Maharashtra, Yashwantrao Chavan; and the facility is administered by National Sports Club of India. It includes the facilities like Tennis, Badminton, Billiards, Table Tennis, Carrom and Wrestling.

In 2002, a team led by renowned architecture firm Shashi Prabhu & Associates and Sterling Engineers as their structural designers, planned an indoor stadium in place of the old open air stadium. The 6000+ capacity indoor stadium with 16 ancillary halls was constructed there with a basement measuring almost 12 acres and accommodating 1000 car parking places. Today, the stadium houses a large health club and a gymnasium.

The stadium is host of the Indian Badminton League and is home of Mumbai Marathas.

== Kabaddi ==
It is the home of the Pro Kabaddi League team U Mumba.

== Badminton ==
The stadium is the home venue of the Premier Badminton League team, the Mumbai Masters.

== Basketball ==
The first ever National Basketball Association (NBA) games in India took place on 4 and 5 October 2019 at the NSCI Dome. The NBA India Games 2019 featured two preseason games between the Sacramento Kings and Indiana Pacers, and marked the first time that teams from a North American sports league played in India.

== Connectivity ==
The stadium can be reached by train. Nearest railway stations are Mahalaxmi and Lower Parel on the Western Line, and Chinchpokli on the Central Line.
