= 2013 in India =

- Centuries: 19th; 20th; 21st
- Decades: 1990s; 2000s; 2010s; 2020s
- See also: List of years in India; Timeline of Indian history

Events in the year 2013 in the Republic of India.

== Incumbents ==
Photo	Post	Name
	(India) President	Pranab Mukherjee
	(India) Vice President	Mohammad Hamid Ansari
	(India) Prime Minister	Manmohan Singh
	(India) Chief Justice	Altamas Kabir (till 18 July)
	(India) Chief Justice	P. Sathasivam (starting 19 July)

=== Governors ===
Post	Name
Andhra Pradesh	E. S. L. Narasimhan
Arunachal Pradesh	Joginder Jaswant Singh (until 28 May); Nirbhay Sharma (starting 28 May)
Assam	Janaki Ballabh Patnaik
Bihar	Devanand Konwar (until 22 March); D. Y. Patil (starting 22 March)
Chhattisgarh	Shekhar Dutt
Goa	Bharat Vir Wanchoo
Gujarat	Kamala Beniwal
Haryana	Jagannath Pahadia
Himachal Pradesh	Urmila Singh
Jammu and Kashmir	Narinder Nath Vohra
Jharkhand	Syed Ahmed
Karnataka	Hansraj Bhardwaj
Kerala	Hansraj Bhardwaj (until 22 March); Nikhil Kumar (starting 22 March)
Madhya Pradesh	Ram Naresh Yadav
Maharashtra	Kateekal Sankaranarayanan
Manipur	Gurbachan Jagat (until 22 July); Ashwani Kumar (23 July-31 December); Vinod Duggal (starting 31 December)
Meghalaya	Ranjit Shekhar Mooshahary (until 30 June); Krishan Kant Paul (starting 30 June)
Mizoram	Vakkom Purushothaman
Nagaland	Nikhil Kumar (until 21 March); Ashwani Kumar (starting 21 March)
Odisha	Murlidhar Chandrakant Bhandare
Punjab	Shivraj Vishwanath Patil
Rajasthan	Shivraj Patil (until 12 May); Margaret Alva (starting 12 May)
Sikkim	Balmiki Prasad Singh
Tamil Nadu	Konijeti Rosaiah
Tripura	Dnyandeo Yashwantrao Patil
Uttar Pradesh	Banwari Lal Joshi
Uttarakhand	Margaret Alva (until 14 May); Aziz Qureshi (starting 14 May)
West Bengal	M.K. Narayanan

== Events ==
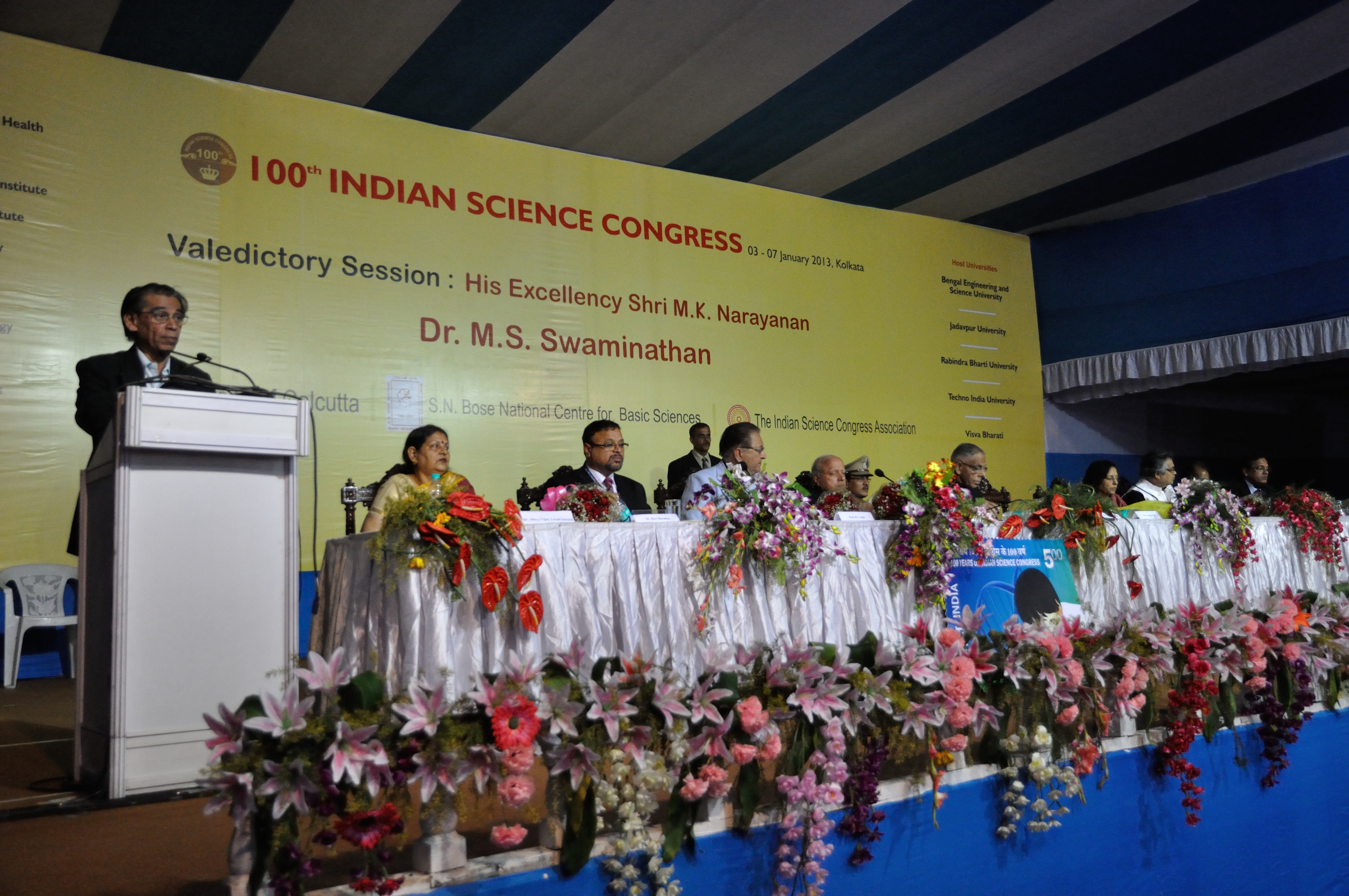
100th Indian Science Congress

=== January - March ===
- 3 to 7 January: 100th Indian Science Conference was organised in Kolkata by the Indian Science Congress Association.
- 6 January -
  - India–Pakistan border incidents begin.
  - M. Karunanidhi announces M. K. Stalin as his successor for Dravida Munnetra Kazhagam leadership.
- 12 January:Swami Vivekananda's 150th birth anniversary was celebrated.
- 14 January: Kumbh Mela begins in Allahabad.
- 26 January: Republic Day of India, Republic Day Parade was held in New Delhi with Bhutan's king Jigme Khesar Namgyel Wangchuck as Chief Guest.
- 31 January to 3 February: 7th India Stone Mart 2013, a trade fair to promote the stone industry, was held in Jaipur.
- 9 February: Afzal Guru is executed in Tihar jail, Delhi for his alleged role in the 2001 Indian Parliament attack.
- 12 February: Indian helicopter bribery scandal came to light.
- 15 February: 2012 DA14 asteroid passes by the Earth over eastern Indian Ocean.
- 19 and 20 February: Nano India 2013, a science conference on nanotechnology, was held in Thiruvananthapuram.
- 21 February: Terror attacks on Hyderabad in Dilsukhnagar area. Two separate explosions killed 17 people.
- 26 February: Railway Budget 2013–14 presented by Minister of Railways, Pawan Bansal.
- 28 February: 2013 Union budget of India presented by Finance Minister P. Chidambaram.
- 8 March: Anti-Sri Lanka protests by Students Federation for Freedom of Tamil Eelam in Tamil Nadu started.
- 10 March: Kumbh Mela ends. An estimated 120 million pilgrims attended the festival.
- 13 March: Hizbul Mujahideen's attacks on Central Reserve Police Force at Bemina in Srinagar.
- 19 March: Lok Sabha passes the Criminal Law (Amendment) Act, 2013.
- 20 March: BrahMos missile was test fired at Visakhapatnam.
- 21 March: Rajya Sabha passes the Criminal Law (Amendment) Act, 2013.
- 27 March: Tamil Nadu Assembly Resolution on Sri Lanka for formation of Tamil Eelam and demands to the Centre to stop treating Sri Lanka as friendly nation.

=== April - June ===
- 2 April: President Pranab Mukherjee signed the Criminal Law (Amendment) Act, 2013.
- 15 April: Daulat Beg Oldi conflict between Indian and Chinese army patrols began.
- 8 May: Siddaramaiah lead congress grabs a clear majority in Karnataka Legislative assembly winning 122 seats from total 224 seats. https://www.thehindu.com/news/national/karnataka/victory-in-karnataka-a-morale-booster-for-congress/article4695816.ece
- 10 May: Two Cabinet ministers, Ashwani Kumar and Pawan Bansal, resign after bribery allegations.
- 16 June - Janata Dal (United) quits from National Democratic Alliance led by Bharatiya Janata Party after seventeen years of association.
- 20 and 21 June - Operation Amla, a terrorist-attack drill/mockup takes place in Tamil Nadu.
- Mid-June onwards: Flash floods in North India.

=== July - September ===
- 14 July: India shuts down its public telegram service.
- 15 August: 67th Independence Day of India
- 22 August: Shakti Mills gang rape
- 26 August: Lok Sabha passes the National Food Security Bill, 2013
- 28 August: The Indian rupee hits a 20 years record low of 68.8450 against the US dollar.
- 29 August: Yasin Bhatkal, the head of the Indian Mujahideen is arrested by the Bihar Police and the Intelligence Bureau (India) near the India–Nepal border.
- 2 September: Rajya Sabha passes the National Food Security Bill, 2013
- 4 September: Raghuram Rajan took over as the 23rd Governor of the Reserve Bank of India.
- 13 September:
  - Narendra Modi is declared as the BJP's new prime ministerial candidate for the 2014 Indian general election.
  - The 4 convicts of the 2012 Delhi gang rape and murder case are sentenced to death by a special court in Delhi .
- 30 September: Former Bihar Chief Minister Lalu Prasad Yadav convicted in the Fodder scam case.

=== October - December ===
- 12 October: Cyclone Phailin makes landfall in Odisha.
- 2–3 November: Diwali.
- 5 November: The Mars Orbiter Mission (MOM), was successfully launched into low Earth orbit by the Indian Space Research Organisation (ISRO).
- 14 November: Sachin Tendulkar retired from International Cricket.
- 19 November 2013: Bharatiya Mahila Bank, India's first all-women commercial bank, starts its operations.
- 9 December: The Sexual Harassment of Women at Workplace (Prevention, Prohibition and Redressal) Act, 2013 came into effect after being approved by Ministry of Women and Child Development.
- 11 December: Supreme Court of India reinstated same-sex relationships as an offence under Section 377 of the Indian Penal Code.
- 12 December: Indian diplomat Devyani Khobragade was arrested in New York, triggering a diplomatic row between India and the US.
- 18 December: The Lokpal and Lokayuktas Bill, 2013 was passed by the Rajya Sabha.

=== Others ===
- National income - ₹112,335,216 million
- Summer: Droughts in Maharashtra surpasses the previous worst famine record of 1972. The droughts were caused by low rainfall in June to October 2012.
- January–March: The Indian economy grew at a rate of 4.8% in the January–March quarter of the 2012–13 fiscal year.
- April–June: The GDP showed a 4.4% growth in the first quarter of the 2013–2014 fiscal year.
- July–September: The GDP grew at 4.8% in the second quarter of the 2013–2014 fiscal year.

== Transport and infrastructure ==
=== January ===
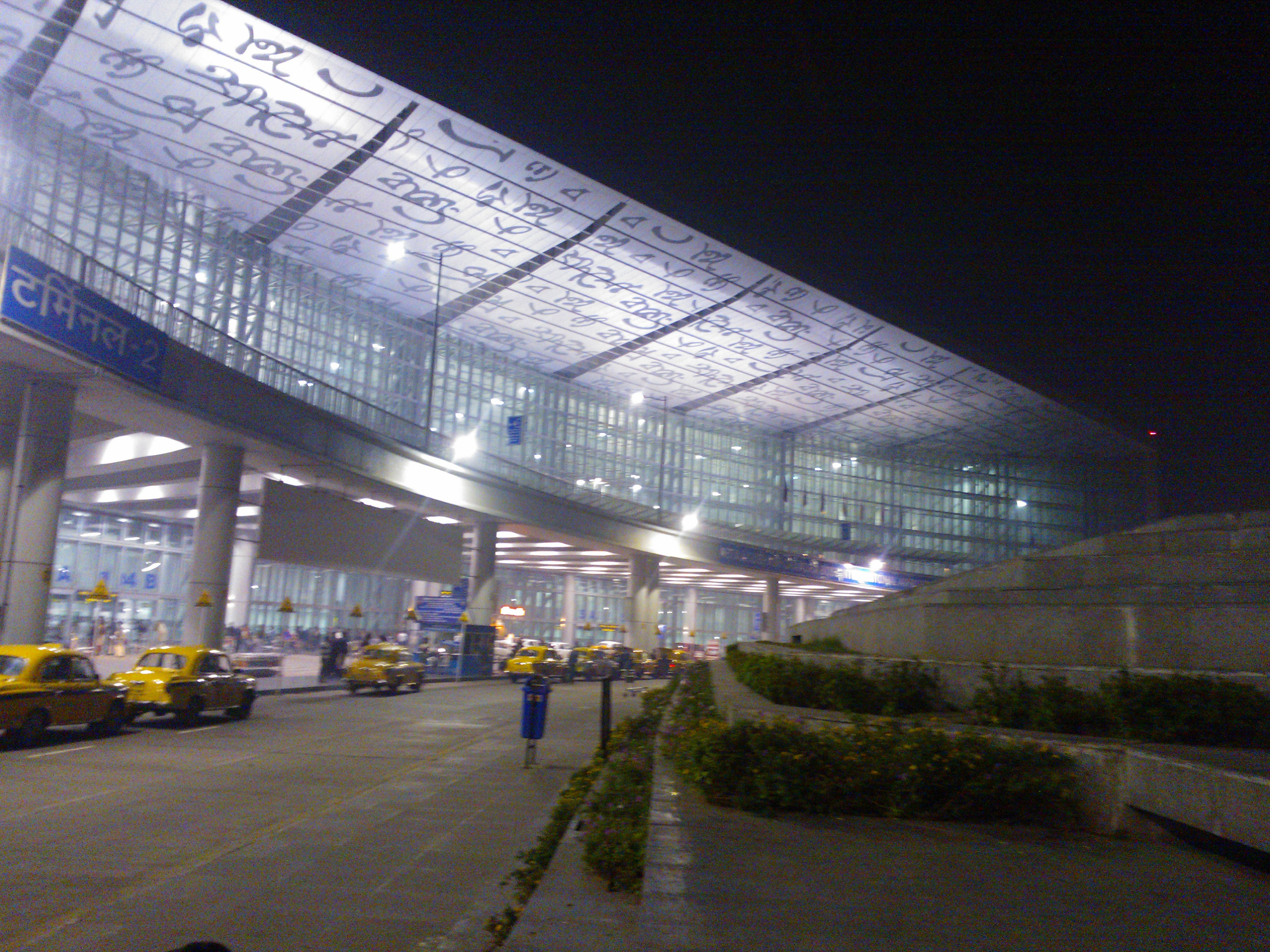
- Netaji Subhash Chandra Bose International Airport
  20 January: A new airport terminal was inaugurated by the President Pranab Mukherjee at Netaji Subhas Chandra Bose International Airport, Kolkata

=== July ===
- Mumbai Monorail has test journeys between Wadala and Chembur.

=== November ===
- Larsen and Toubro began laying tracks for the Hyderabad Metro rail.
- 14 November: Rapid Metro Gurgaon has started its operation.

=== December ===
- Land acquisition for Hyderabad Metro completed.

== Cinema ==
- 3 May: Indian cinema completes 100 years. The first Indian silent film Raja Harishchandra was released in 1913.

== Sports ==
=== January ===
- 2013 Aircel Chennai Open from 31 December 2012 to 6 January 2013.
- 3 January : First professional cricket match in the year 2013 and the 2nd ODI against Pakistan was played in the Eden Gardens, Kolkata in which India was defeated.
- 18-29 January:2013 Lusophony Games to be held in Margao, Goa.
- 31 January: 2013 Women's Cricket World Cup begin in Mumbai.

=== February ===
- 14–21 February: 2013 South Asian Games in Delhi.
- 17 February: 2013 Women's Cricket World Cup finals.
- 18–24 February: 2013 World Hockey League Round 2 Men (Delhi leg) and 2013 World Hockey League Round 2 Women (Delhi leg).

=== April ===
- 2 April: 2013 Indian Premier League opening ceremony was held at Salt Lake Stadium or Yuva Bharati Krirangan in Kolkata.
- 3 April: 2013 Indian Premier League season begin.

=== May ===
- 26 May: 2013 Indian Premier League finals. Mumbai Indians won the series in 6th season of IPL by defeating Chennai SuperKings.

=== June ===
- 23 June - India win the 2013 ICC Champions Trophy by defeating hosts England in the finals.

=== July ===
- 3–7 July: 2013 Asian Athletics Championship continental tournament, winner China with 15 gold medals.

=== September ===
- 29 September: India beat Malaysia 3–0 to win Sultan of Johor Cup (Under 21).

=== October ===
- 27 October: 2013 Indian Grand Prix at Buddh International Circuit, Greater Noida.

=== November ===
- 6 – 26 November: World Chess Championship 2013 to be held in Chennai.

=== December ===
- 1–14 December: 2013 Kabaddi World Cup was to be held in India. Host city is Bathinda.
- 6–15 December: 2013 Men's Hockey Junior World Cup held in New Delhi, India.

=== Unknown ===
- 2012–13 I-League end date.
- 2013 Federation Cup held in Srinagar, Kashmir.
- 2013–14 I-League begin date.

== Publications ==
- “Body Offering” by Makarand Paranjape
- “Kalahandi” by Tapan Kumar Pradhan
- “The Accidental Apprentice” by Vikas Swarup
- “The Oath of the Vayuputras” by Amish Tripathi
- “Tiger by the Trail” by Venita Coelho

== Deaths ==
=== January ===
- 3 January – M. S. Gopalakrishnan, violinist.
- 3 January – Shikaripura Ranganatha Rao, archaeologist.
- 3 January – Sekhar Sinha, cricketer, cancer.
- 4 January – Salik Lucknawi, Urdu poet.
- 5 January – Haradhan Bandopadhyay, Indian actor.
- 5 January – K. B. Mallappa, Indian politician, MLA for Arkalgud in the Karnataka Legislative Assembly (1977–1989).

=== March ===
- 11 March – Teja Narla, Indian child actor (born 1996)
- 11 March – Sripada Pinakapani, Carnatic Vocalist (born 3 August 1913) .

=== April ===
- 14 April – P. B. Sreenivas, [[Tamil]] and Telugu Legendary singer
- 21 April – Shakuntala Devi, Great Mathematician
- 23 April – Shamshad Begum, Pioneering playback singer (Born 1919)
- 22 April – JS Verma – 27th Chief Justice of India

=== May ===
- 30 May – Rituparno Ghosh, Renowned Bengali Director
- 31 May – Abir Goswami, actor

=== June ===
- 3 June – Jiah Khan, actress
- 20 June – Dicky Rutnagur, journalist (born 1931)
- 22 June – Soccor Velho, footballer (born 1983)

=== July ===
- 4 July - Satish Tare, Marathi actor
- 12 July – Pran, Actor (born 1920)
- 18 July - Vaali, Writer and poet (born 1931)
- 28 July- Jagdish Raj, actor

=== October ===
- 9 October – Srihari, Actor (Born on 15 August 1964)
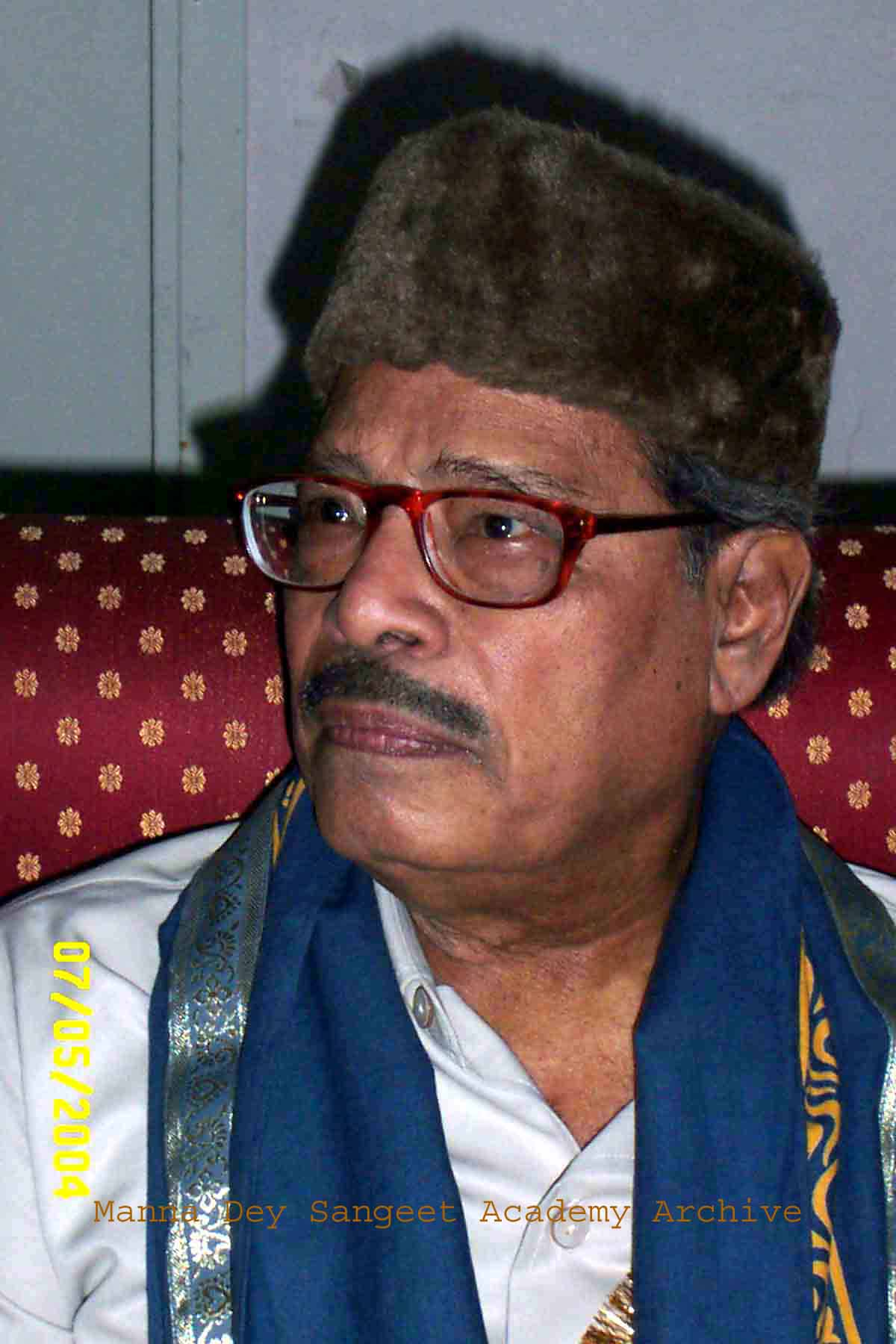
- Manna Dey
  24 October – Manna Dey, Legendary Singer (b.1919)
- 28 October – Rajendra Yadav, Writer (Born on 28 August 1929)

=== November ===
- 10 November – Vijaydan Detha, Writer (Born on 1 September 1926)
- 17 November – Om Prakash Valmiki, Writer (Born on 30 June 1950)

=== December ===
- 27 December – Farooq Sheikh, actor (born 25 March 1948)

== See also ==
- 2012 in India
- 2011 in India
- 2010 in India
- 2013 in Indian sports
