= 2013 in Indian sports =

== Events ==
=== January ===
- 2013 Aircel Chennai Open from 31 December 2012 to 6 January 2013. Janko Tipsarević was the singles champion and pair of Benoît Paire and Stanislas Wawrinka grabbed the doubles trophy.
- 3 January : First professional cricket match in the year 2013 and the 2nd ODI against Pakistan was played in the Eden Gardens, Kolkata in which India was defeated.
- 6 January : 3rd ODI against Pakistan was played in the Feroz Shah Kotla, New Delhi in which India won but lost the series 1-2.
- 11 January: First of the five ODIs between India and England at Saurashtra Cricket Association Stadium, Rajkot. England won by 9 runs.
- 14 January: 2013 Hockey India League begin.
- 15 January: Second ODI betweenEngland and India at Nehru Stadium, Kochi. India won by 127 runs, and level series 1-1.
- 19 January: Third ODI betweenEngland and India at JSCA International Cricket Stadium, Ranchi. India won by 7 wickets, and lead series 2-1.
- 20 January: 2012–13 World Series Hockey final.
- 23 January: Fourth ODI betweenEngland and India at PCA Stadium, Mohali. India won by 5 wickets and seal series 3-1.
- 27 January: Fifth ODI betweenEngland and India at HPCA Stadium, Dharamshala. England won by 7 wickets in dead rubber to finish the series, India winning it 3-2.
- 31 January: 2013 Women's Cricket World Cup begin in Mumbai.

=== February ===
- 2013 Santosh Trophy begin.
- 6 February – 10 February: 2013 Irani Cup at Wankhede Stadium, Mumbai. Rest of India retained the Irani cup by virtue of their first innings lead against Ranji Champions Mumbai.
- 7 February - 10 February: 2013 Golf Premier League was scheduled. Uttarakhand Lions won the first title.
- 14 February – 21 February: 2013 South Asian Games in Delhi.
- 17 February: 2013 Women's Cricket World Cup finals. Australia won the world cup by beating West Indies by 114 runs. 2013 Hockey India League finals. Ranchi Rhinos became the first Hockey India League Champions.
- 18 February: 2012–13 Elite Football League of India season end.
- 18 February - 24 February: 2013 World Hockey League Round 2 Men (Delhi leg) and 2013 World Hockey League Round 2 Women (Delhi leg). India and Ireland advanced to round 3 in men's tournament and India and Japan advanced to round 3 in women's tournament.

=== March ===
- 2013 Santosh Trophy end. Services won the Santosh Trophy 2013 after defeating Kerala in the 2013 final at Jawaharlal Nehru International Stadium, Kaloor, Kochi.

=== April ===
- 3 April: 2013 Indian Premier League season begin.

=== May ===
- 21 May: Pune Warriors India was suspended from the Indian Premier League due to the encasing of team's bank guarantee after Sahara failed to pay the entire franchise fees.
- 26 May: 2013 Indian Premier League finals. Mumbai Indians won by beating Chennai Super Kings by 23 runs.
- 18–22 May: 2013 Asian Wrestling Championships was held in New Delhi. South Korea was on first place with 5 Gold Medals, 2 Silver Medals and 1 Bronze Medal. Uzbekistan with 4 Gold and Japan with 2 Gold, 3 Silver and 5 Bronze were on second and third place respectively. Host India finished fifth (after China) with 2 Gold, 1 Silver and 6 Bronze and total of 9 Medals.

=== August ===
- 14 August - 31 August: 2013 Indian Badminton League is scheduled. Hyderabad Hotshots won the inaugural title, led by Saina Nehwal.

=== October ===
- 27 October: 2013 Indian Grand Prix at Buddh International Circuit, Greater Noida. Red Bull's Sebastian Vettel won it for the third time in a row.

=== November ===
- 2 November - 10 November: 2013 Lusophony Games held in Goa. Postponed to be held during 18–29 January 2014
- 6 November - 26 November: World Chess Championship 2013 to be held in Chennai. Magnus Carlsen won it with 6½–3½ after ten of the twelve scheduled games against Viswanathan Anand.
- 17 November: 2013 Superbike World Championship season Indian Leg Buddh International Circuit, Greater Noida.

=== December ===
- 1–14 December: 2013 Kabaddi World Cup in Bathinda, Punjab. India came out winners in both Men's and Women's championship.
- 6–15 December: 2013 Men's Hockey Junior World Cup is to be held in India. Host city is New Delhi. India was placed at 10th rank.

=== Unknown ===
- 2012–13 I-League end date.
- 2013 I-League 2nd Division.
- 2013 i1 super series.
- 2013 Durand Cup
- 2013–14 I-League begin date.
- 2013 I-League U20.
- 2013 Lusophony Games held in Margao, Goa.

== Multi-sport Event ==
Event	Medals			Report
Event	Gold medal	Silver medal	Bronze medal	Report
2013 Lusophony Games	Postponed to 2014			
2013 South Asian Games	Delayed			
2013 World Games	1	0	0	
Total	1	0	0	

== Sports Leagues in 2013 ==
Game	Tournament	Winner	Tournament Length	
Game	Tournament	Winner	From	To
American Football	2012-13 Elite Football League of India	TBA	22 September 2012	18 February 2013
Association Football	2012–13 I-League	Churchill Brothers	6 October 2012	12 March 2013
Association Football	2013 I-League 2nd Division	Rangajied United	9 March 2013	28 April 2013
Association Football	2013 I-League U20	Pune F.C.		
Association Football	2013–14 I-League	Bengaluru FC	21 September 2013	28 April 2014
Badminton	2013 Indian Badminton League	Hyderabad Hotshots	14 August 2013	31 August 2013
Cricket	2012–13 Ranji Trophy	Mumbai		30 January 2013
Cricket	2013 Indian Premier League	Mumbai Indians	3 April 2013	26 May 2013
Cricket	2013–14 Ranji Trophy	Karnataka	27 October 2013	2 February 2014
Field Hockey	2012-13 World Series Hockey	Cancelled	15 December 2012	20 January 2013
Field Hockey	2013 Hockey India League	Ranchi Rhinos	14 January 2013	10 February 2013
Golf	2013 Golf Premier league	Uttarakhand Lions	7 February 2013	10 February 2013
Motor Sports	2013 i1 super series	Postponed		
