= Sports in Asia =

Overview of sport in Asia

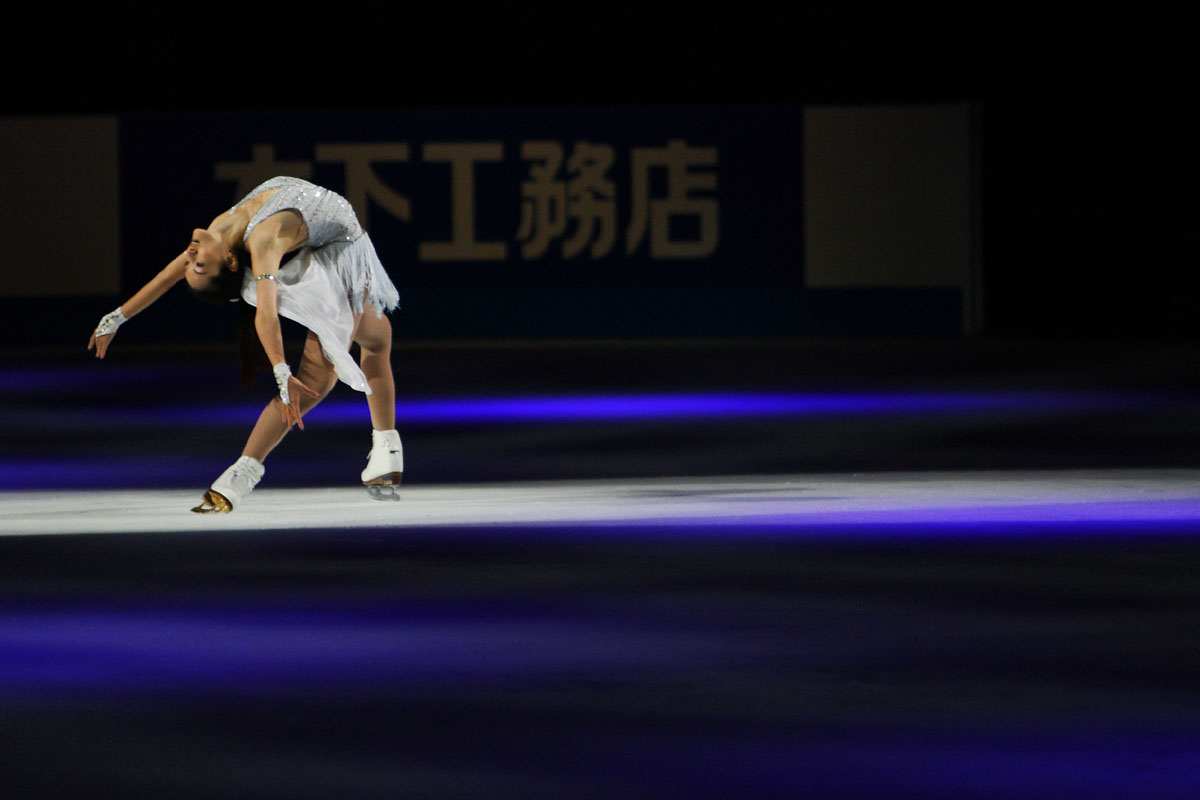
Shizuka Arakawa during the Japan Gymnastics Open

Association football is the most popular sport in Asia. Basketball is the second most popular sport in Asia, mostly popular in East Asia. Cricket is the third most popular sport in Asia, and is most popular in South Asia. Other popular sports in Asia include baseball, badminton and table tennis among others. There are also some traditional sports that are popular in certain regions of Asia, such as the South Asian sports kabaddi and kho-kho, and sepak takraw in Southeast Asia. Top sporting nations/regions in Asia include China, Japan, South Korea, Taiwan, India, Iran, Kazakhstan and Uzbekistan.

== History ==
=== Ancient era ===
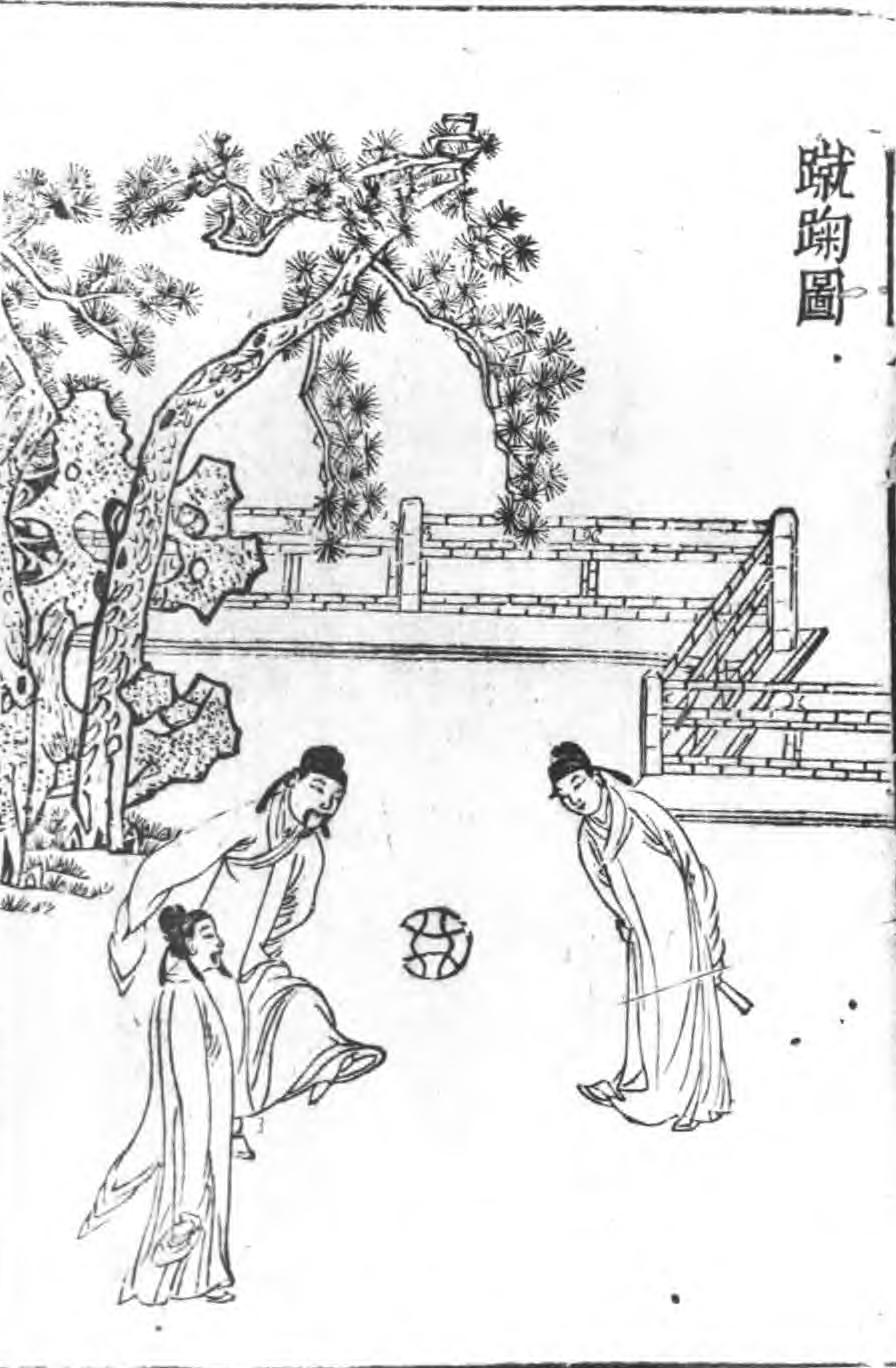
Cuju, an ancient Chinese predecessor to association football.

Before the European colonisation of the region, many traditional sports were played in different parts of Asia. Various modern board games such as chess, snakes and ladders, and ludo trace their origin to ancient South Asian games, while go originates in East Asia. Many martial arts originated in Asia, with major schools found in South, Southeast and East Asia. Many sports spread across Asia in antiquity; kabaddi was present in both Persia and South Asia, while atya-patya and other traditional games are shared between South and Southeast Asia. Kite-flying was a Chinese export that likely spread through trade and Buddhist missionary activities. Though they are not directly related, some ancient Chinese sports, such as cuju and chuiwan, bear uncanny resemblances to modern-day sports like football and golf. Competitions on horseback were common, with the Central Asian-origin Mughal Empire having played a role in bringing equestrianism into South Asia; tent pegging was played throughout western and southern parts of Asia, while modern polo was standardised from earlier forms of the game found in British India, which were similar to the ancient polo played in other parts of Asia.

=== Modern era ===
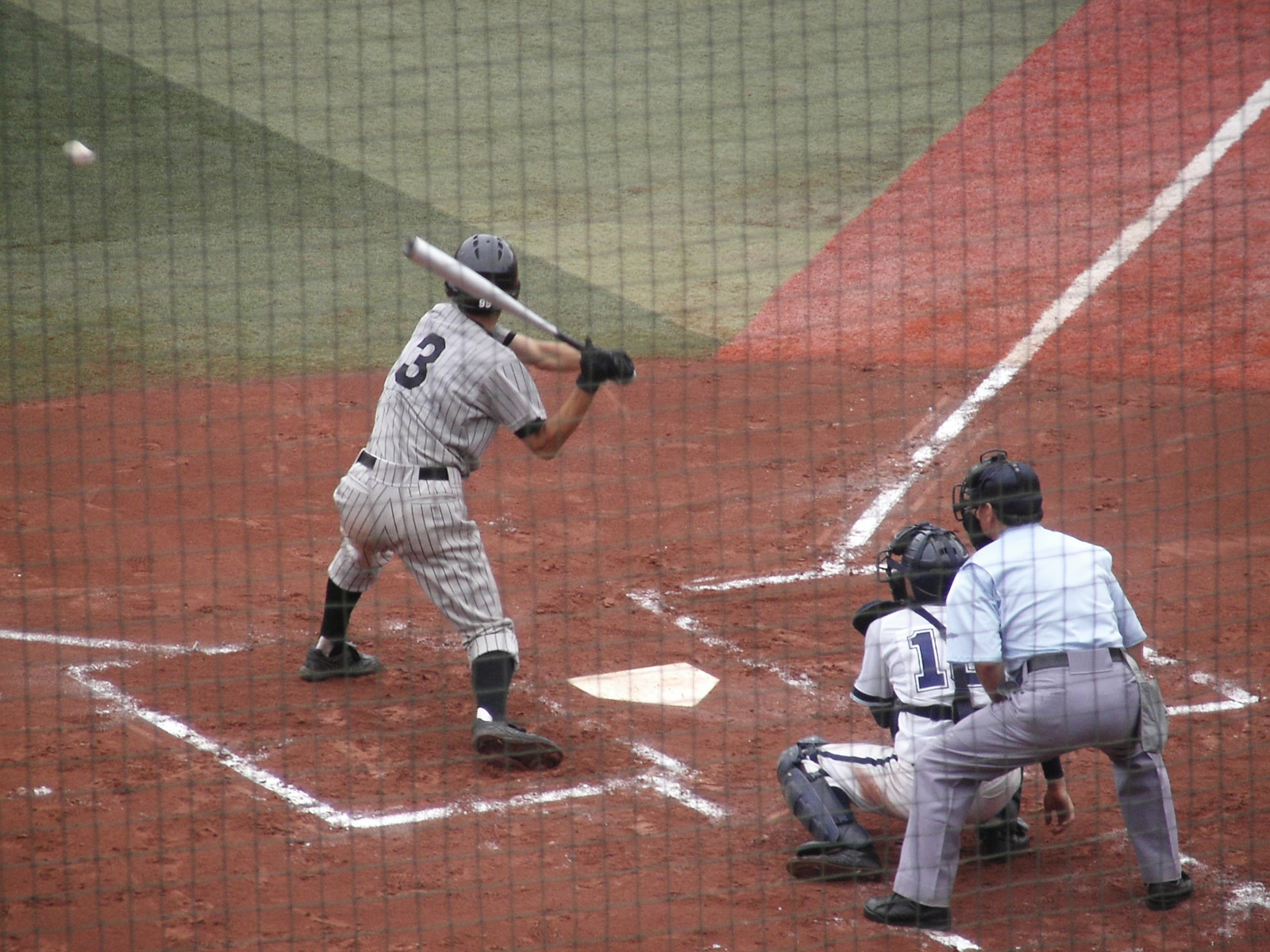
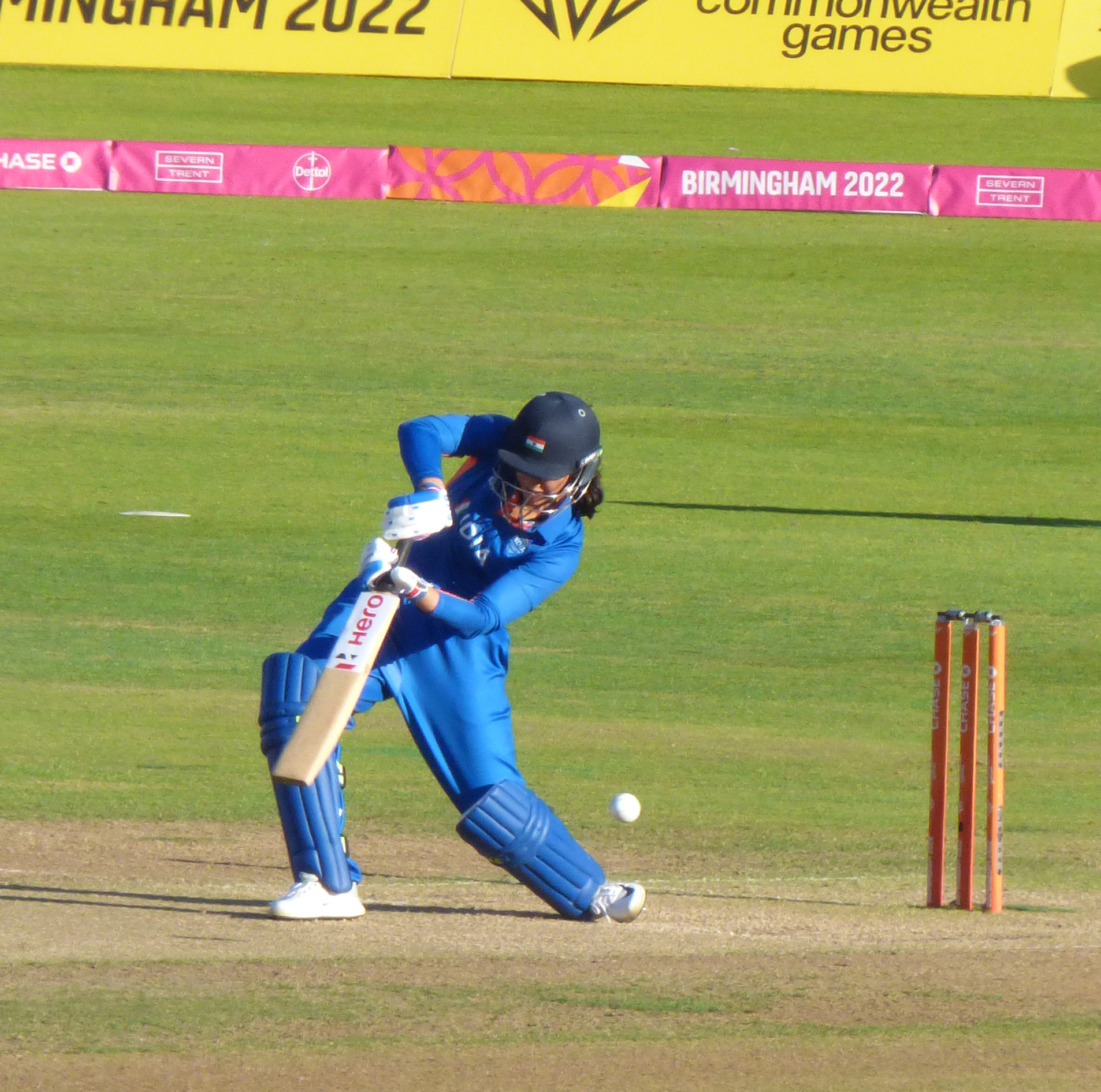
The bat-and-ball sports baseball (left) and cricket (right) are popular in East and South Asia respectively due to American and British influences.

American colonisation and Christian missionary activities introduced basketball into the Philippines and China, where it became one of their most popular sports. Baseball became popular in East Asia through American contact in the mid-19th century, and further grew after Japan colonised parts of the region, as Japanese colonies increasingly played their coloniser's sport as a way to prove their equality. Similar phenomena factored into the massive growth of other Western sports in parts of Asia that experienced European colonisation.

After the colonial era ended, Western sports played a significant role in nation-building and connecting different Asian countries together; cricket allowed India to unify its diverse people and conduct "cricket diplomacy" to cool tensions with its neighbor Pakistan, while the Asian Games, inspired in part by the post-colonial vision of India's first Prime Minister, Jawaharlal Nehru, went on to become one of the biggest sporting events in the world. Table tennis, backed by the Chinese Communist Party as a cheap sport the developing nation could excel in at a global level, became very popular in China.

In the modern day, South Asia is home to the Indian Premier League (IPL - cricket), the second-most valued sports league in the world (behind the NFL) in terms of per-match media rights fees. Some of its traditional sports, such as kho-kho and arm wrestling, have also become professional; kabaddi in particular is growing globally, with Asian countries like South Korea and Iran finding some success in international kabaddi. Asia in general has become more successful at football; the closest that an Asian nation has come to winning the FIFA World Cup is when Korea came in fourth at the 2002 FIFA World Cup.

== Basketball ==
Basketball is popular in a number of Asian countries. FIBA Asia is organized by International Basketball Federation (FIBA) and manages the sport over the region. Major contending nations are China, Japan, Philippines, Iran, South Korea and Taiwan. In China and the Philippines, the sport has a major following comparable to Association Football in Europe.

The Philippines has the best finish in the FIBA World Cup from teams outside the Americas and Europe winning bronze in 1954 FIBA World Championship. Also, the team took a fifth-place finish in 1936 Summer Olympics, the best finish by any team outside the Americas, Europe and Oceania. China has dominated the FIBA Asia Championship since the 1970s while the Philippines, Taiwan, South Korea, Japan and Iran continues to be strong contenders. In women's basketball, the FIBA Asia Women's Championship has been fought between China, Taiwan, Japan and South Korea.

The FIBA World Cup was held in Asia in: 1978 in the Philippines, 2006 in Japan and 2019 in China. In 2023, the Philippines and Japan will once again host the World Cup, along with Indonesia.

The main tournament for Asian basketball clubs is the FIBA Asia Champions Cup, held since 1981.

== Association football ==
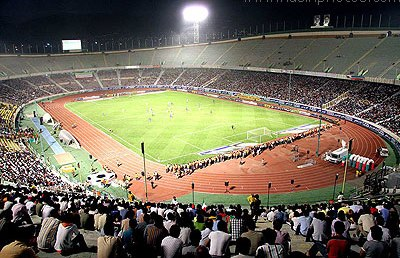
The Azadi Stadium in Iran

The Asian Football Confederation was founded in 1954. They organize several tournaments for national teams, most notably the AFC Asian Cup since 1956 and AFC Women's Asian Cup since 1975, as well as qualifying tournaments for the FIFA World Cup, FIFA Women's World Cup and the Summer Olympics. The AFC Champions League is Asia's premier tournament for clubs, first held in 1967.

The AFC members are split into five regional federations: West, Central, South, East and South East. These federations organize regional football championships.

The most successful Asian countries in international men's competitions have been Japan, China, North Korea, South Korea, Hong Kong, Chinese Taipei, Macau and Mongolia in East, and Iran, United Arab Emirates, Qatar, Iraq, Saudi Arabia, Jordan, Oman, Syria, Bahrain, Lebanon, Palestine, Kuwait and Yemen in West, India, Pakistan, Sri Lanka, Bangladesh, Maldives, Nepal and Bhutan in South, Uzbekistan, Kyrgyzstan, Tajikistan, Turkmenistan and Afghanistan in Central, and Vietnam, Thailand, Malaysia, Indonesia, Philippines, Singapore, Myanmar, Cambodia and Laos in South East.

In women's football, East Asian have been dominant, especially Japan, China, South Korea, Chinese Taipei, Hong Kong and North Korea, Southeast Asian have been dominant, especially is Vietnam, Thailand, Myanmar and Philippines, West Asian have been dominant, especially is Jordan, Iran, Bahrain and United Arab Emirates, South Asian have been dominant, especially is India, Nepal and Bangladesh, and Central Asian has been dominant, especially is Uzbekistan. Asia has been more successful in women's football than in men's football in the continent.

The 2002 FIFA World Cup was hosted jointly by Japan and South Korea. It was the first edition not held in Europe or the Americas. The 2017 FIFA U-17 World Cup and 2022 FIFA U-17 women's world cup was hosted by India. The 2022 FIFA World Cup was hosted by Qatar.

The People's Republic of China hosted the first edition of the FIFA Women's World Cup in 1991, as well as the 2007 edition.

The top five most popular football clubs on social media from Asia excluding China as of 31 October 2018:

#	Football club	Country	Followers
1	Persib	Indonesia	15.4 million
2	Al-Hilal	Saudi Arabia	11.3 million
3	Al-Ittihad	Saudi Arabia	4.6 million
4	Persija	Indonesia	4.2 million
5	Kerala Blasters	India	3.6 million

== Bandy ==
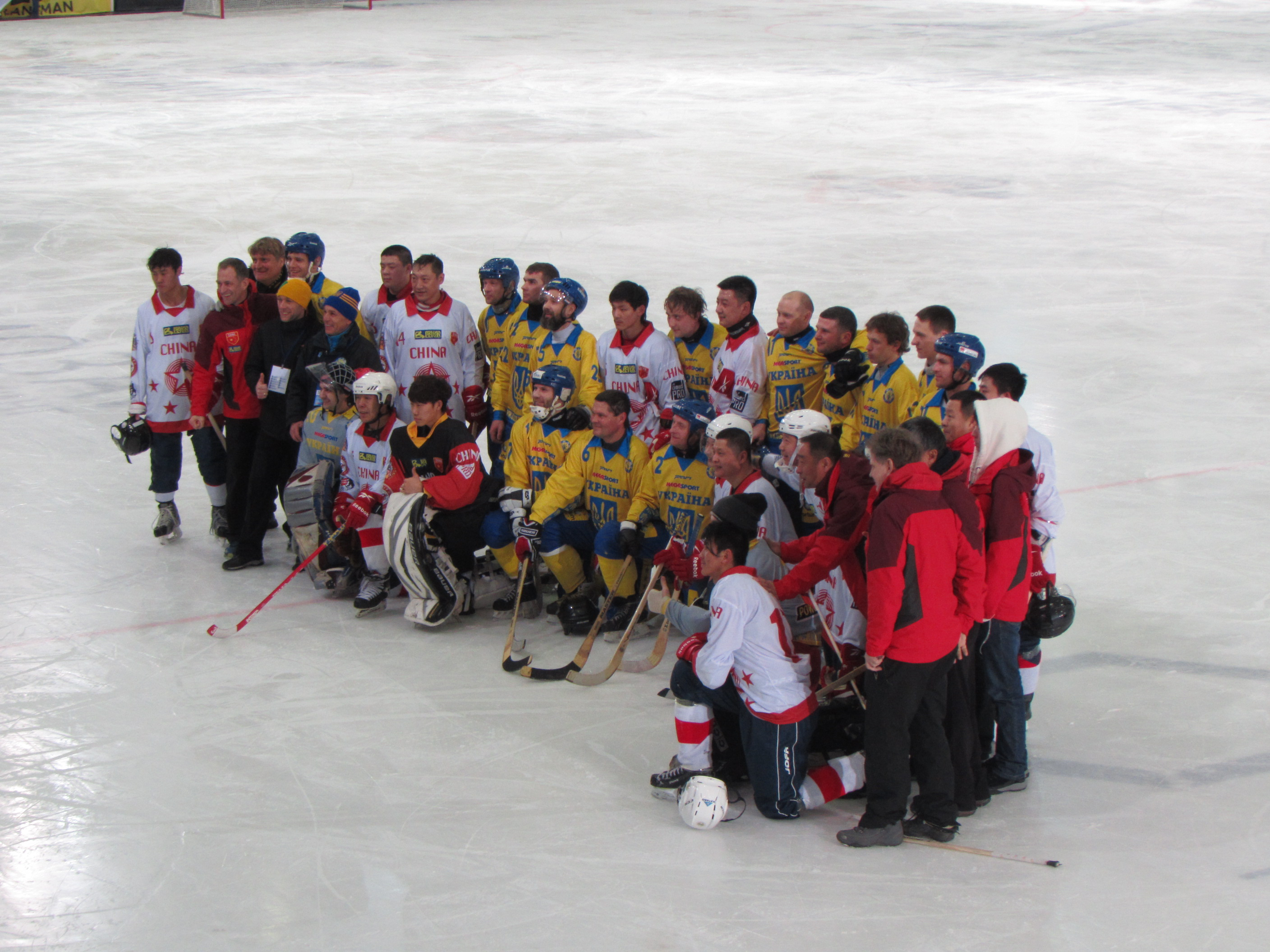
The China national bandy team with Ukraine

Bandy is a growing sport in Asia. While traditional in some former Soviet republics, especially Kazakhstan (bandy is the only team sport in which Kazakhstan has captured World Championship medals), it is more or less new in some other ones. President Tsakhiagiin Elbegdorj invited the Mongolian national team after its bronze medal in Division B of the 2017 World Championship. Japan also reached the semi-final. Consequently, Mongolia beat them in the bronze match. China started to compete in the World Championship in 2015 and the women's national team in 2016. Both Division B of the men's tournament 2018 and 2018 Women's World Championship (in which Japan plan to debut) will be played in China, which will be the first time either tournament is held in a totally Asian country (the area north and west of the Ural River is located in Europe, thus Kazakhstan, where the 2012 World Championship was held, is a transcontinental country). In September 2017 it was announced that an FIB office for development and marketing in Asia would open in Harbin. Apart from the countries mentioned, Afghanistan, Armenia, India and Kyrgyzstan are also FIB members. In the Philippines an attempt started in 2016 to introduce rink bandy. FIB is especially interested in having South Korea join the bandy community. As of 2017 negotiations are ongoing.

== Baseball ==
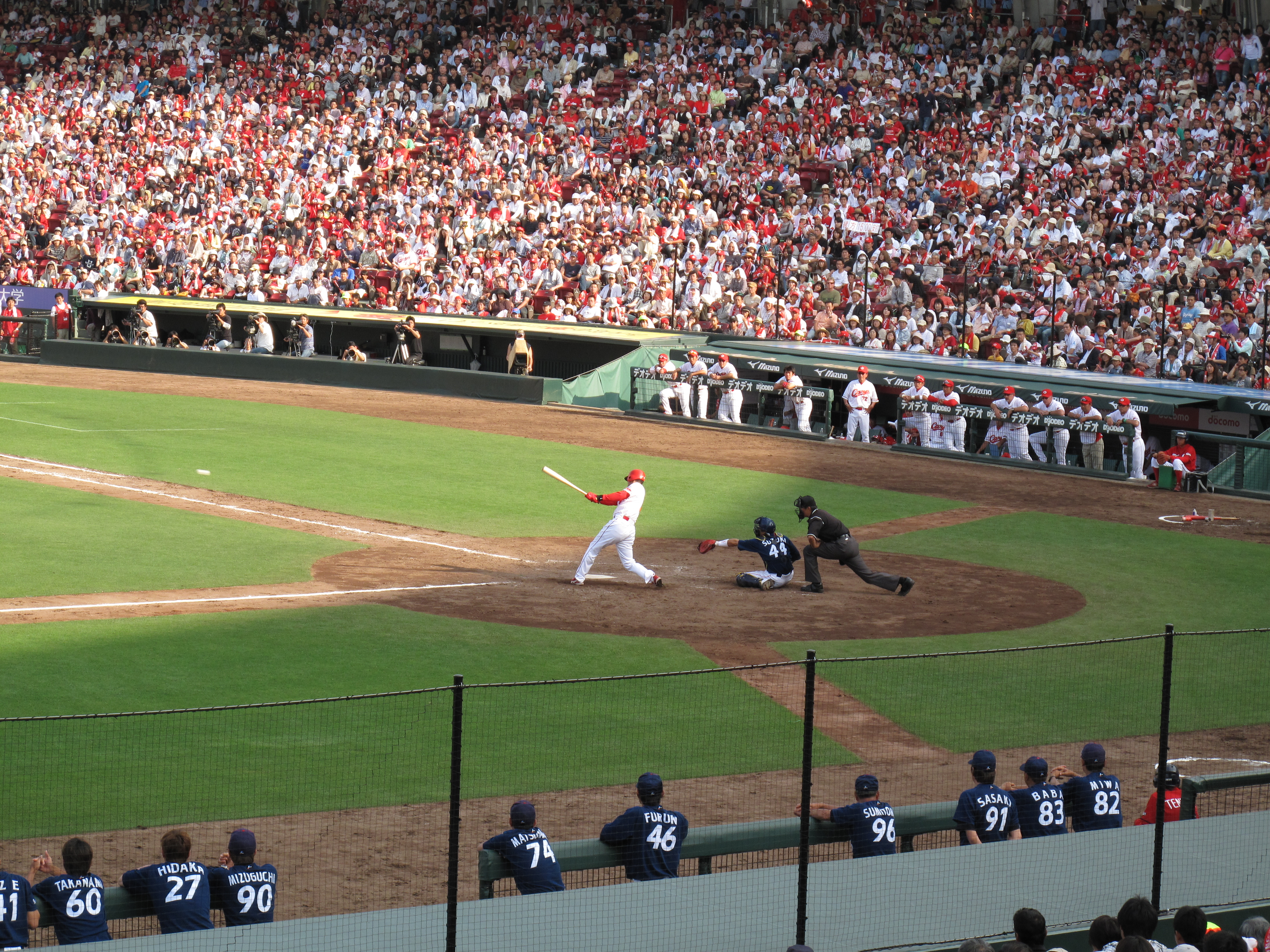
A Nippon Professional Baseball match in Hiroshima

Baseball is the most popular sport in Japan, where it was introduced in the 1870s and became professional in the 1920s. The Japanese Baseball League was operated from 1936 to 1949 and reorganized into the Nippon Professional Baseball in 1950. Teams have been historically identified with their corporate owners, not where the team is based, and have often relocated to other cities.

Over 50 Japanese-born players have played in Major League Baseball, including Ichiro Suzuki, Hideki Matsui, Koji Uehara and Hideo Nomo.

The Japan national baseball team has won the 2006 and 2009 World Baseball Classic. High school baseball is also popular in Japan.

In South Korea, baseball was introduced in the 1900s and the KBO League was established in 1982, The South Korean team was the runner-up in the 2009 World Baseball Classic. The Taiwan-based Chinese Professional Baseball League was established in 1989. Like the NPB, these two leagues feature teams owned by major corporations.

== Boxing ==
Boxing is a popular sport in Asia where there is a vast following of professional fights across the region. Its mostly popular in countries such as Kazakhstan, Uzbekistan, Japan, Philippines, India and South Korea. Kazakhstan is the most dominant in professional and amateur level boxing in Asia with 12 World Amateur Boxing Championships, 7 Summer Olympic Games Gold medalist and 46 Asian Amateur Boxing Championships. Manny Pacquiao of the Philippines is considered as one of the most successful boxers in history, and is currently the only octuple champion in the sport. Indian female boxer Marykom is the most successful female boxer in the AIBA women's world boxing championship with six gold medals, the most by any female boxer.

== Cricket ==
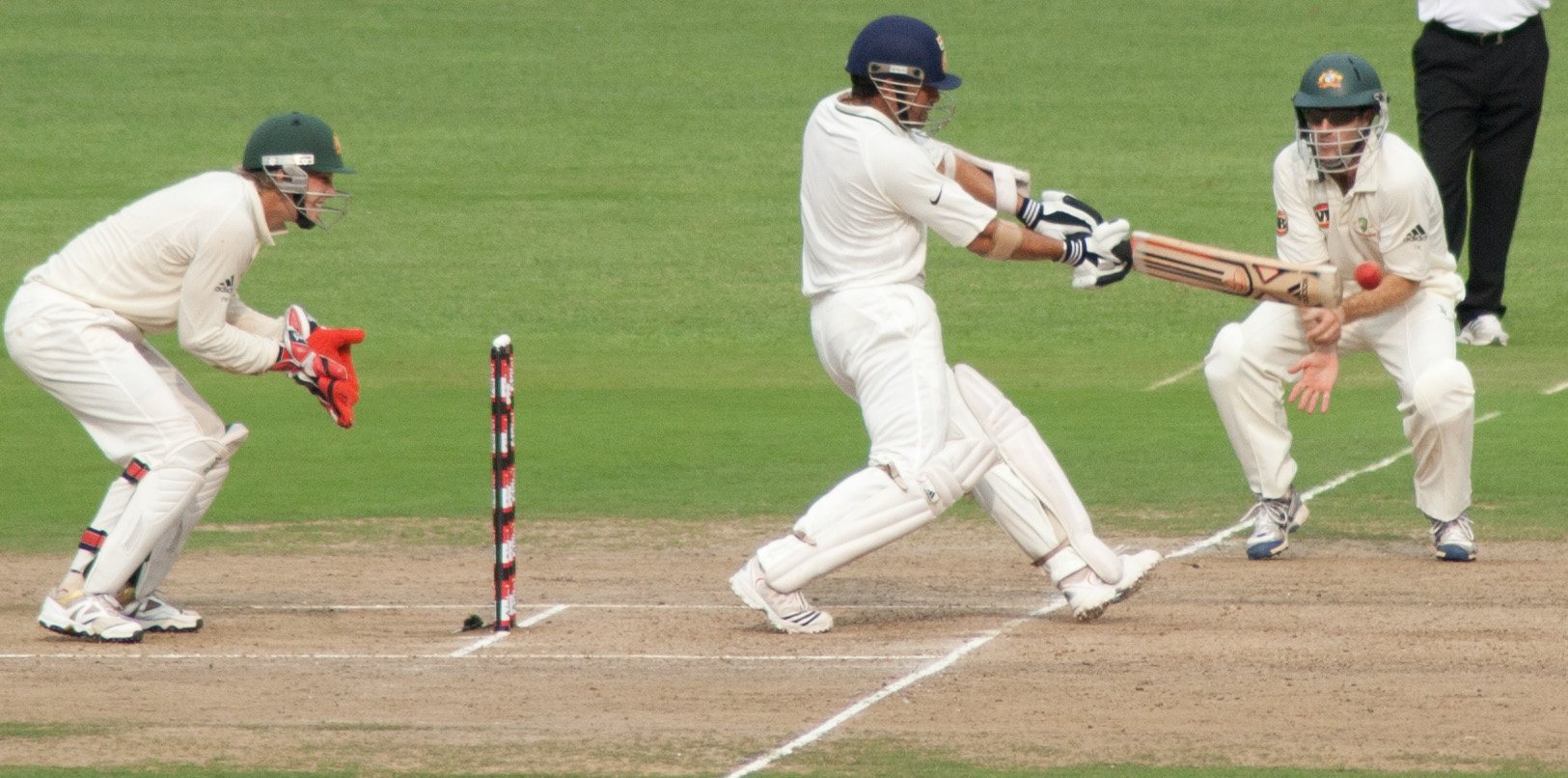
Indian batsman Sachin Tendulkar in a cricket test

Cricket is a popular sport in South Asia. Five countries have Test status: Afghanistan, Bangladesh, India, Pakistan, and Sri Lanka.

At the Cricket World Cup, India has won two editions, while Pakistan and Sri Lanka have each won once. At the ICC World Twenty20, three countries have won once. Bangladesh was known to be the weakest of the four teams (Afghanistan did not have test status before 2017), having won 7 out of 91 Test matches and 95 out of 309 One Day International matches. But now it making its mark in cricket after winning against the top quality sides in world cricket.

The Asian Cricket Council is a cricket organization which was established in 1983, to promote and develop the sport of cricket in Asia. Membership in the Asian Cricket Council is divided between five Test Status members and twenty five associate members. Two Asian countries, namely Philippines and South Korea, are members of ICC East Asia-Pacific instead of the Asian Cricket Council. Moreover, Indonesia and Japan, previously in ICC East Asia-Pacific, applied for membership in the Asian Cricket Council in 2024. In 2020, Thailand and Japan competed for the first time in the Women's T20 World Cup and Under-19 Cricket World Cup respectively. Malaysia has applied to host an international cricket event in the 2023-2031 timeframe.

The Asia Cup is the continental One Day International and Twenty20 International cricket tournament. ACC also organises multiple pathway tournaments for Asia Cup qualification.

The India–Pakistan cricket rivalry attracts up to one billion viewers. However, because of the tense India–Pakistan relations, Test series have been interrupted between 1962 and 1977, 1999-2003 and since 2008 and now they only play each other in ICC events.

== Cue sports ==
Cue sports, also known as billiards sports or pool sports, are popular in Asia, particularly in East and South Asian nations with Eight Balls, Nine Balls and Snooker being the most popular types. The Asian Confederation of Billiard Sports is the main governing body in Asia. Cue sports are played in the Asian Games and other regional competitions. Various nations have produced world champions, predominantly from the Philippines, India, Taiwan, Japan and Hong Kong.

The Philippines is often considered to be the pool capital of the world because many of the top players coming from the country. Filipino players are known for their exceptional mastery of the game and innovative strategies that have revolutionized the way the sport is played. This was known as the Filipino Invasion which was participated by various Filipino players including Hall of Famers Efren The Magician Reyes and Francisco Bustamante.

== Field hockey ==
Field hockey is a popular sport in India and Pakistan, and both nations are known for their fierce rivalry. The India–Pakistan field hockey rivalry attracts millions of viewers, and both nations have a record of facing each other in the first seven Asian games hockey finals. They have played a total of nine finals against each other, in which Pakistan has won seven gold and India has won two gold. The Pakistan men's national field hockey team is also the most successful team in the Men's FIH Hockey World Cup, having won the tournament four times. The India men's national field hockey team dominates the Field hockey at the Summer Olympics, with eight medals compared to Pakistan's three medals.

== Golf ==
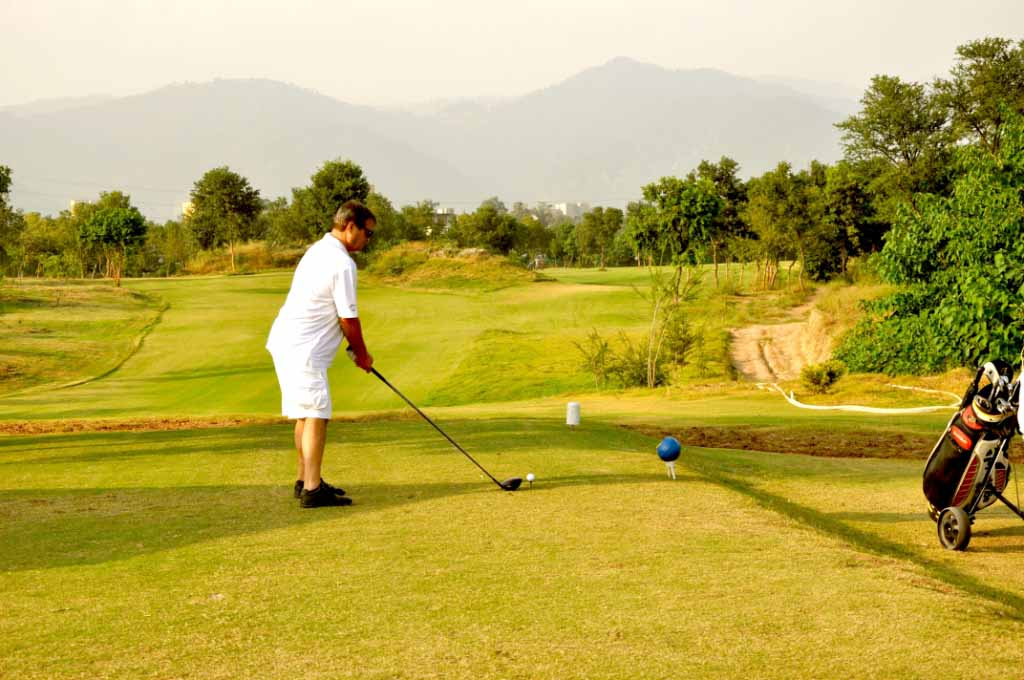
The Islamabad Golf Club in Pakistan

Few Asian male golf players have claimed wins on the PGA Tour or European Tour. Among the most successful have been K. J. Choi, who has eight PGA Tour wins, a third place at the 2004 Masters Tournament and three appearances at the Presidents Cup; Hideki Matsuyama, who has six PGA Tour wins including the 2021 Masters Tournament and two World Golf Championships events; Shigeki Maruyama, who has three PGA Tour wins; and Yang Yong-eun, who won the 2009 PGA Championship. Since 2010, more players have begun to enjoy success including Bae Sang-moon with two PGA Tour victories, Wu Ashun with three victories on the European Tour and Li Haotong with two.

In contrast, many Asian female golf players have enjoyed success on the leading LPGA Tour, with those from South Korea and Taiwan becoming a dominant force in the sport. Several have claimed major tournament wins, most notably Inbee Park (seven), Se Ri Pak (five), Yani Tseng (five) and Jiyai Shin (two).

Notable men's golf tournaments in Asia include the WGC-HSBC Champions (China), Zozo Championship (Japan), CJ Cup (South Korea), CIMB Classic (Malaysia), DP World Tour Championship, Dubai, Dubai Desert Classic, Abu Dhabi Golf Championship, (United Arab Emirates), and Saudi International (Saudi Arabia). Meanwhile, the most notable women's golf tournaments in Asia are the LPGA KEB–Hana Bank Championship, BMW Ladies Championship (South Korea), Blue Bay LPGA, Buick LPGA Shanghai (China), Toto Japan Classic, Sime Darby LPGA Malaysia and LPGA Taiwan Championship.

== Kabaddi ==
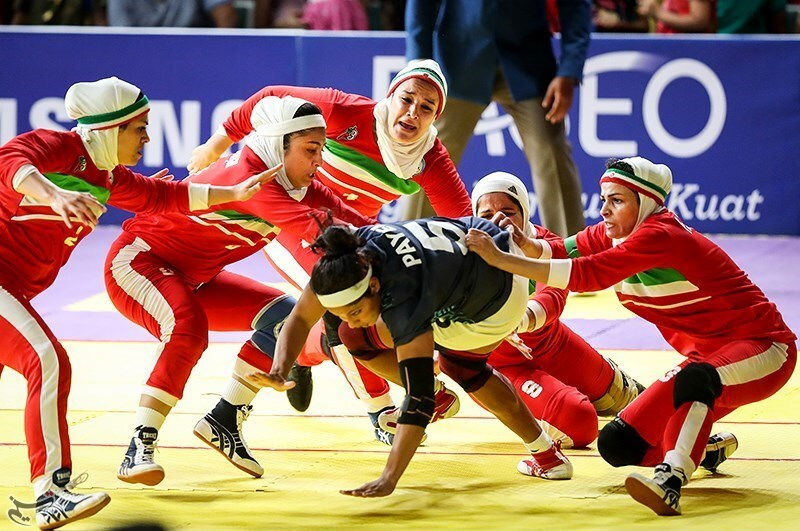
The Iranian women's team won the 2018 Asian Games kabaddi final against India, showcasing the global rise of the South Asian-origin sport.

Kabaddi is a contact sport that originated in ancient India. The game is popular in South Asia, and is gaining global popularity in countries like South Korea, Iran and Thailand. The national teams of these countries have competed in the Kabaddi World Cup. The Pro Kabaddi League of India is broadcast in many Asian countries. Kabaddi is also played at the Asian Games.

== Kho kho ==
Kho-kho is a tag sport originating from India. It featured in the 2016 South Asian Games. In 2022, an Indian franchise kho-kho competition known as Ultimate Kho Kho completed its first season, becoming one of the most-viewed sports competitions in India. There is also an Asian Kho Kho Championship which has been held since 1996.

== Motorsport ==
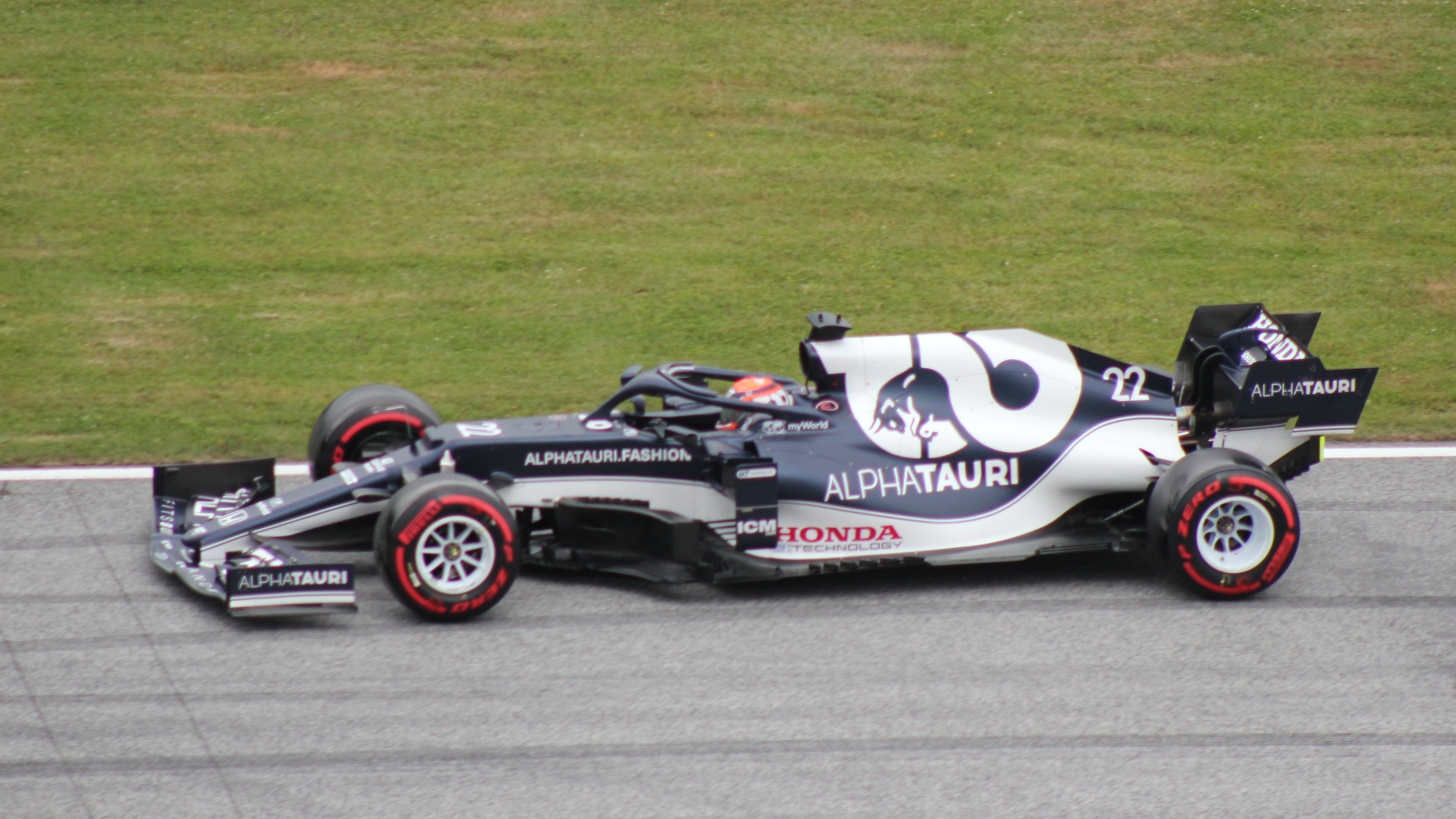
Yuki Tsunoda driving an AlphaTauri

Motorsport is popular in Japan. The country has hosted several international races, such as the Japanese Grand Prix (Formula One), 6 Hours of Fuji (FIA World Endurance Championship), Japanese motorcycle Grand Prix (Grand Prix motorcycle racing), Suzuka 8 Hours (FIM Endurance World Championship), Rally Japan (World Rally Championship), FIA WTCC Race of Japan (World Touring Car Championship), Indy Japan 300 (IndyCar Series), NASCAR Thunder 100 and Coca-Cola 500 (NASCAR Cup Series).

Japan has hosted professional championships like the Super GT, Super Formula, All Japan Sports Prototype Championship, Japanese Touring Car Championship, All Japan Road Race Championship and D1 Grand Prix.

Kazuyoshi Hoshino, Masahiro Hasemi and Toshio Suzuki won the 1992 24 Hours of Daytona with a NISMO; Masanori Sekiya won the 1995 24 Hours of Le Mans; and Takuma Sato won the 2017 Indianapolis 500. Other notable Japanese racecar drivers include Satoshi Motoyama, Seiji Ara, Satoru Nakajima, Kazuki Nakajima and Kamui Kobayashi.

The Macau Grand Prix, held since 1954, is known for its Formula 3, touring car and superbikes races.

Formula One started adding more races in Asia with the Malaysian Grand Prix in 1999, followed by the Bahrain Grand Prix and Chinese Grand Prix in 2004, Singapore Grand Prix in 2008, Abu Dhabi Grand Prix in 2009, Korean Grand Prix in 2010, Indian Grand Prix in 2013 and Azerbaijan's European Grand Prix in 2016.

Major circuits in China (Shanghai and Zhuhai), Malaysia, Indonesia, Thailand, Bahrain, Dubai and Abu Dhabi have hosted several other international championships like the FIA World Endurance Championship, World Touring Car Championship, FIM Road Racing Grand Prix Championship, Superbike World Championship, GP2 Series, GP2 Asia Series, Super GT and V8 Supercars.

In rallying, the Abu Dhabi Desert Challenge is held since 1991 and the Sealine Cross-Country Rally is held since 2012. Both are part of the FIA Cross Country Rally World Cup and FIM Cross-Country Rallies World Championship. Qatari driver Nasser Al-Attiyah has won 2011 and 2015 Dakar Rally, the 2008 and 2015 FIA Cross Country Rally World Cup, the Production World Rally Championship in 2006, and the 2014 and 2015 World Rally Championship-2.

== Rugby union ==
Rugby union in Asia is currently dominated by Japan. The Japanese national team are so far the only Asian team to have competed in the Rugby World Cup, having appeared in all seven tournaments so far.

The Hong Kong Sevens is one of the most prestigious rugby sevens events in the world. it is held since 1976 and is part of the World Rugby Sevens Series since 2000. Other notable rugby sevens tournaments in Asia have been the Dubai Sevens, Japan Sevens, Singapore Sevens, Malaysia Sevens, Sri Lankan Sevens and China Sevens. Japan hosted the 2019 Rugby World Cup.

The Top League is Japan's premier rugby club competition, founded in 2003. In 2016, the Sunwolves joined the Southern Hemisphere-based Super Rugby. The team is based in Tokyo but also plays home games in Singapore.

== Table tennis ==
Table tennis is particularly popular in China. Other notable Asian table tennis countries include Hong Kong, Japan, South Korea, Singapore, and Taiwan.

== Tennis ==
The most successful Asian countries in tennis have been India, China, Japan and Taiwan.

In men's singles, Kei Nishikori was finalist at the 2014 US Open and two ATP Masters 1000 tournaments, whereas Vijay Amritraj reached quarter-finals at four Grand Slams and was semifinalist at the 1982 WCT Finals. In men's doubles, Leander Paes of India won eight Grand Slams tournaments and Mahesh Bhupathi won four Grand Slams tournaments and in mixed double Paes won 10 and Bhupathi won 8 grand slams. Leander Paes won total of 18 grand slams which is the highest by an Asian tennis player and also he is among the very few to complete career slam in both men's doubles and mixed doubles. Rohan Bopanna won his first mixed doubles grand slam title at the 2017 French Open. So far only Indian men are successful in winning grand slams and also the most successful Asian team at the Davis Cup having reached the finals on three occasions.

Sania Mirza is the most successful female tennis player having won 6 grand slams 3 each in women's doubles and mixed doubles. Sania Mirza was ranked World No.1 in women's doubles for 91 consecutive weeks. In women's singles, Li Na won two Grand Slam titles at the 2011 French Open and 2014 Australian Open. Naomi Osaka of Japan became the second women's singles player to win Grand slam winning 2018 US Open and 2019 Australian Open, whereas Kimiko Date-Krumm won four Japan Open titles was semifinalist at three Grand Slam tournaments. Notable women's doubles players include, Ai Sugiyama, Hsieh Su-wei, Peng Shuai and Zheng Jie.

== Volleyball ==
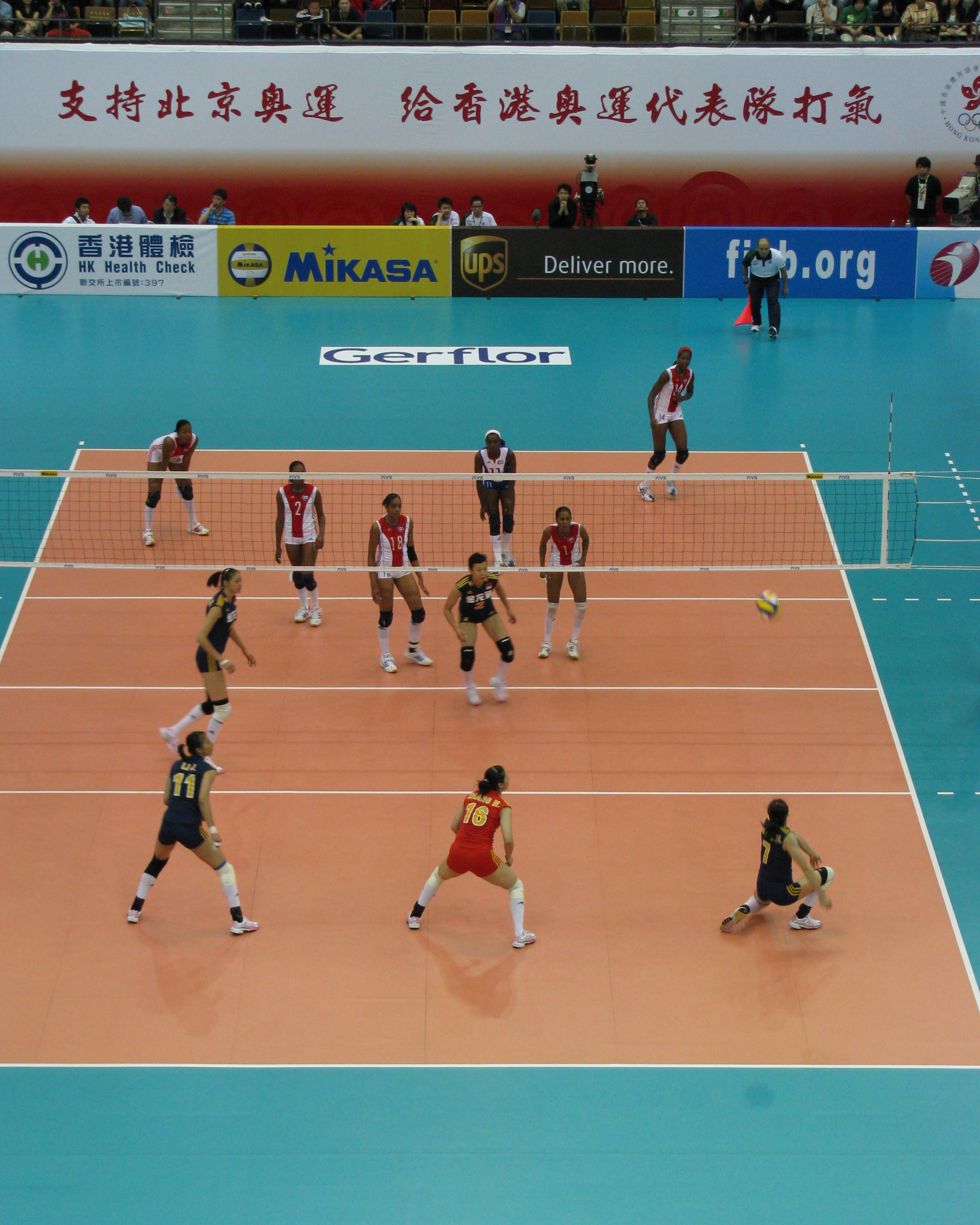
The national volleyball team of China at the FIVB Volleyball World Grand Prix in Hong Kong

In men's volleyball, the Japan national team has won three Olympic medals, including a gold medal in 1972. Also, the team was third at the 1970 and 1974 World Championship, and second at the 1969 and 1977 World Cup. Japan has been less successful in the World League era. Meanwhile, South Korea finished fourth at the 1978 World Championship and Iran finished sixth at the 2014 World Championship.

In women's volleyball, the China and Japan national teams are dominant. China has won three Olympic gold medals, two World Championships, four World Cups and a Grand Prix. Meanwhile, Japan has won two Olympic gold medals, three World Championships and a World Cup. South Korea has also claimed third places at the Olympic Games, World Championship, World Cup and World Grand Prix.

== Games ==
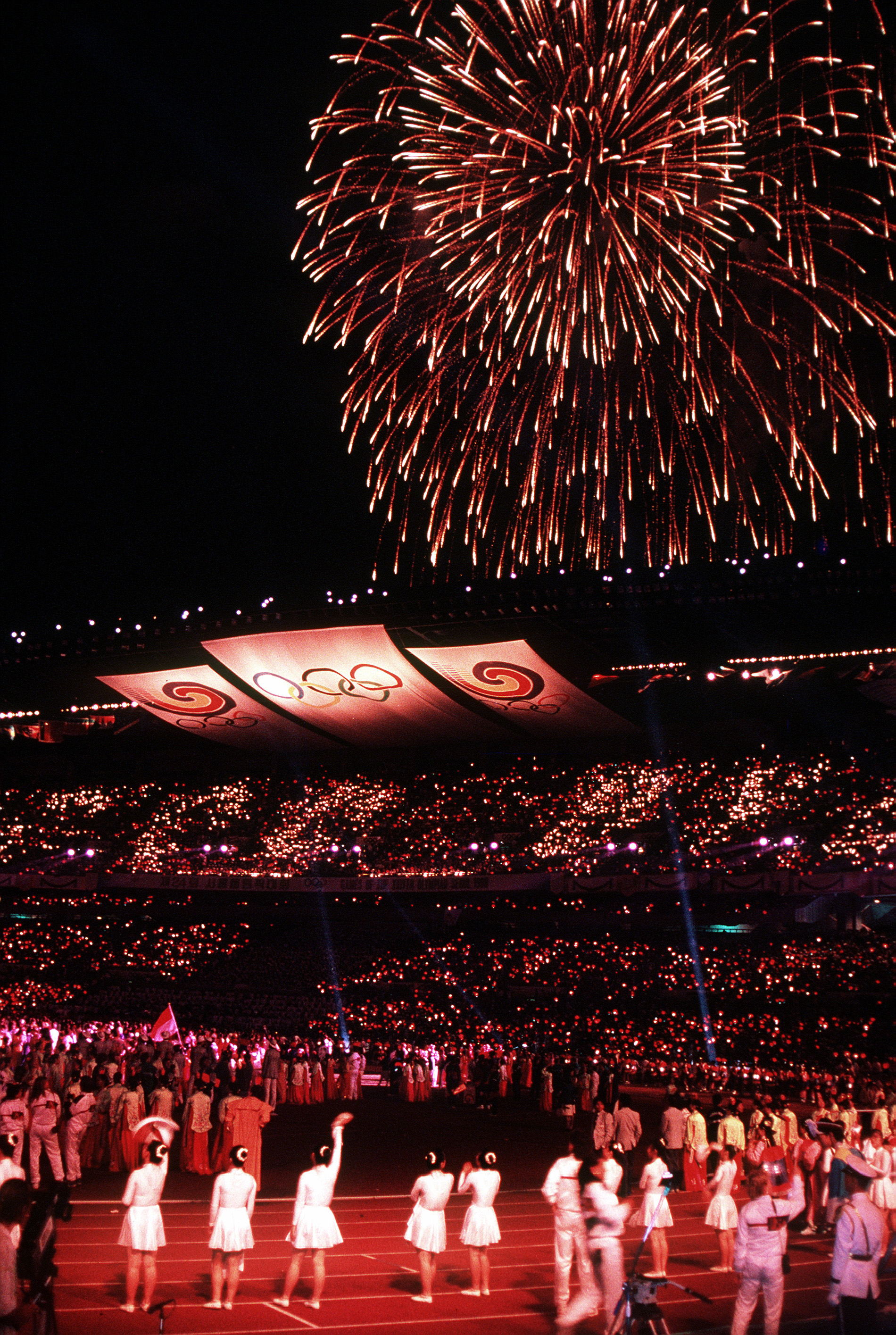
Closing ceremonies of the 1988 Summer Olympics in Seoul

Asia has hosted a total of eight Olympic Games: four Summer Olympic Games: 1964 in Tokyo, 1988 in Seoul, 2008 in Beijing, and 2020 once again in Tokyo, and four Winter Olympic Games: 1972 in Sapporo, 1998 in Nagano, 2018 in Pyeongchang, and 2022 in Beijing. Beijing became the first city to host both Summer and Winter Olympic Games.

The three most successful countries at the Olympic Games are China (winners in 2008 and runners-up in 2004, 2012, and 2020), Japan (third in 1964, 1968, and 2020) and South Korea (fourth in 1988 and fifth in 2010 and 2012). Asian countries have dominated judo, taekwondo, badminton and table tennis, while they have also been successful in archery, diving, gymnastics and weightlifting.

The Far Eastern Championship Games was a multi-sport event held from 1913 to 1934, featuring competitors from all over Asia. After World War II, the Asian Games, also called the Asiad, were established in 1951. The Asian Games are the world's second largest multi-sport event after the Olympic Games. There is also a winter edition of Asian Games, which was first held in 1986.

Israel has been banned from the Asian Games since 1978, with the AGF citing security reasons. However, Israeli sports officials contend that it was due to Arab and Chinese opposition to their participation. Samuel Lalkin, general security of the Israel Sports Federation, said "The excuse that we pose big security problems is completely ridiculous if you think that North Korea is competing. That's a worse problem, but they want to see us out. We can't take part because of what we are." Due to the Arab–Israeli conflict, Israel sports federations have joined the European confederations.

Some Asian countries compete at the Commonwealth Games, most notably India (4th in all-time medals), Malaysia (11th), Singapore (13th) and Pakistan (15th). The 1998 edition was held in Kuala Lumpur, whereas the 2010 edition was held in Delhi.

== See also ==
- Asia Cup
- Asian Championship
- Association football in Asia
- Australian rules football in Asia
- List of professional sports leagues in Asia
- Olympic Council of Asia
- Sport in Africa
- Sport in Europe
- Sports in North America
- Sport in Oceania
- Sport in South America
- Sport in South Asia
- UCI Asia Tour
