= List of professional sports leagues in Asia =

This is a list of Professional sports leagues in Asia.

League	Founded	Sport	Country	Teams
Durand Cup	1888	Football	India	20
CFL Premier Division	1898	Football	India	26
MFA Elite Division	1902	Football	India	16
Hong Kong First Division League	1908	Football	Hong Kong	14
Hong Kong Second Division League	1909	Football	Hong Kong	16
Chennai Football League	1934	Football	India	12
Lebanese Premier League	1934	Football	Lebanon	12
Ranji Trophy	1934	Cricket	India	38
Santosh Trophy	1941	Football	India	37
Jordanian Pro League	1944	Football	Jordan	12
West Bank Premier League	1944	Football	Palestine	12
Dhaka First Division Football League	1948	Football	Bangladesh	14
Dhaka Second Division Football League	1948	Football	Bangladesh	18
Dhaka Third Division Football League	1948	Football	Bangladesh	18
Nippon Professional Baseball	1950	Baseball	Japan	12
Sri Lanka Rugby Championship	1950	Rugby Union	Sri Lanka	8
Hong Kong Third Division League	1951	Football	Hong Kong	16
Jordanian Premier Basketball League	1952	Basketball	Jordan	6
Quaid-i-Azam Trophy	1953	Cricket	Pakistan	8
Hong Kong A1 Division Championship	1954	Basketball	Hong Kong	10
Martyr's Memorial A-Division League	1954	Football	Nepal	14
Mongolian National Premier League	1955	Football	Mongolia	10
AFC Asian Cup	1956	Football	Asia	24
Syrian Basketball League	1956	Basketball	Syria	12
Bahraini Premier League	1957	Football	Bahrain	12
Kuwaiti Division I Basketball League	1957	Basketball	Kuwait	12
Irani Cup	1959	Cricket	India	2
DPR Korea Premier Football League	1960	Football	North Korea	12
FIBA Asia Cup	1960	Basketball	Asia	16
President's Trophy	1960	Cricket	Pakistan	8
Duleep Trophy	1961	Cricket	India	6
Kuwaiti Premier League	1961	Football	Kuwait	10
Indian Open	1964	Golf	India	-
FIBA Women's Asia Cup	1965	Basketball	Asia	12
Syrian Premier League	1966	Football	Syria	12
AFC Champions League Elite	1967	Football	Asia	32
Japan LPGA Tour	1968	Golf	Japan	-
X-League	1971	American football	Japan	12
Deodhar Trophy	1973	Cricket	India	3
Japan Golf Tour	1973	Golf	Japan	-
Liga de Elite	1973	Football	Macau	10
Qatar Stars League	1973	Football	Qatar	12
UAE Football League	1973	Football	United Arab Emirates	12
Iraq Stars League	1974	Football	Iraq	20
AFC Women's Asian Cup	1975	Football	Asia	12
Iranian Volleyball Super League	1975	Volleyball	Iran	14
Philippine Basketball Association	1975	Basketball	Philippines	12
Gaza Strip Premier League	1976	Football	Palestine	12
Japan Handball League	1976	Handball	Japan	13
Oman Professional League	1976	Football	Oman	14
Saudi Premier League	1976	Basketball	Saudi Arabia	12
Saudi Professional League	1976	Football	Saudi Arabia	16
National Basketball League (Australia)	1979	Basketball	Australia	10
Qatari Basketball League	1979	Basketball	Qatar	9
Qatari Volleyball League	1979	Volleyball	Qatar	10
Iraqi Professional Basketball League	1980	Basketball	Iraq	11
V.League 1	1980	Football	Vietnam	14
Basketball Champions League Asia	1981	Basketball	Asia	9
New Zealand National Basketball League	1981	Basketball	New Zealand	11
Philippine Columbian Association Open	1981	Tennis	Philippines	-
Pioneer Football League (Bangladesh)	1981	Football	Bangladesh	46
Qatar Handball League	1981	Handball	Qatar	10
Women's National Basketball League	1981	Basketball	Australia	8
Cambodian Premier League	1982	Football	Cambodia	10
KBO League	1982	Baseball	South Korea	10
Men's Hockey Asia Cup	1982	Field Hockey	Asia	8
K League 1	1983	Football	South Korea	12
Asia Cup	1984	Cricket	Afghanistan; Bangladesh; India; Sri Lanka; Pakistan	6
Oman Basketball League	1984	Basketball	Oman	7
Women's Hockey Asia Cup	1985	Field Hockey	Asia	8
Hong Kong Women League	1986	Football	Hong Kong	8
Davis Cup Asia/Oceania Zone	1988	Team Tennis	Asia & Oceania	Varies
Major League Tournament	1988	Cricket	Sri Lanka	23
Chinese Professional Baseball League	1989	Baseball	Taiwan	6
Nadeshiko League	1989	Football	Japan	12
Asian Cup Winners' Cup	1990-2002	Football	Asia	-
Guam Soccer League	1990	Football	Guam	6
Lao League	1990	Football	Laos	10
V.League 2	1990	Football	Vietnam	12
Yemeni League	1990	Football	Yemen	11
Azadegan League	1991	Football	Iran	18
Billie Jean King Cup Asia/Oceania Zone	1992	Team Tennis	Asia & Oceania	Varies
J1 League	1992	Football	Japan	20
Kazakhstan Hockey Championship	1992	Ice hockey	Kazakhstan	10
Kyrgyz Premier League	1992	Football	Kyrgyzstan	10
Lebanese Basketball League	1992	Basketball	Lebanon	12
Tajikistan Higher League	1992	Football	Tajikistan	10
Uzbek League	1992	Football	Uzbekistan	16
Yokary Liga	1992	Football	Turkmenistan	8
Kolkata Women's Football League	1993	Football	India	20
Dhaka Premier Division Football League	1993	Football	Bangladesh	14
K-1	1993	Kickboxing	Japan	-
Pancrase	1993	Mixed Martial Arts	Japan	-
Asian Tour	1994	Golf	Singapore; Thailand; Indonesia; Philippines; Malaysia; Myanmar; India; Bangladesh; China; Taiwan; Hong Kong; Macau; Sri Lanka; Brunei; Australia; New Zealand; Pakistan; United States; Canada; South Korea	-
Men's V.League	1994	Volleyball	Japan	18
Women's V.League	1994	Volleyball	Japan	11
Chinese Basketball Association	1995	Basketball	China	20
China Table Tennis Super League	1995	Table Tennis	China	20
Myanmar Lethwei Federation	1995	Lethwei	Myanmar	-
Chinese Volleyball Super League	1996	Volleyball	China	14
Chennai Open	1996	Tennis	India	-
Singapore Premier League	1996	Football	Singapore	8
Thai League 1	1996	Football	Thailand	16
Chinese Women's Super League	1997	Football	China	12
Professional Golf Tour of India	1997	Golf	India	-
Korean Basketball League	1997	Basketball	South Korea	10
Thai League 2	1997	Football	Thailand	18
Women's Korean Basketball League	1998	Basketball	South Korea	6
Women's Japan Basketball League	1998	Basketball	Japan	14
Iranian Basketball Super League	1998	Basketball	Iran	12
Iranian Futsal Super League	1998	Futsal	Iran	14
Goa Professional League	1998	Football	India	12
V-Women's League	1998	Football	Vietnam	8
AVC Men's Volleyball Champions League	1999	Volleyball	Asia	8
AVC Women's Volleyball Champions League	1999	Volleyball	Asia	8
National Cricket League of Bangladesh	1999	Cricket	Bangladesh	8
J2 League	1999	Football	Japan	20
Japan Football League	1999	Football	Japan	15
Deep	2001	Mixed Martial Arts	Japan	-
Iran Pro League	2001	Football	Iran	16
Kazakhstan National League	2001	Basketball	Kazakhstan	8
China Baseball League	2002	Baseball	China	8
Men's Proliga	2002	Volleyball	Indonesia	7
Women's Proliga	2002	Volleyball	Indonesia	7
Vijay Hazare Trophy	2002	Cricket	India	38
Women's Chinese Basketball Association	2002	Basketball	China	18
Universal Reality Combat Championship	2002	Mixed Martial Arts	Philippines	-
Asia League Ice Hockey	2003	Ice hockey	Japan; South Korea	6
Indonesian Basketball League	2003	Basketball	Indonesia	11
Japan Rugby League One	2003	Rugby union	Japan	12
RISE	2003	Kickboxing	Japan	-
Super Basketball League	2003	Basketball	Taiwan	5
A-League Men	2004	Football	Australia	12
Chinese Super League	2004	Football	China	16
China League One	2004	Football	China	16
Malaysia Premier Futsal League Division 1	2004	Futsal	Malaysia	8
Malaysia Super League	2004	Football	Malaysia	12
Volleyball Vietnam League	2004	Volleyball	Vietnam	9
Women's Asia Cup	2004	Cricket	Asia	8
Women's Super Basketball League	2004	Basketball	Taiwan	4
Jordan Women's Pro League	2005	Football	Jordan	6
Marianas Soccer League	2005	Football	Northern Mariana Islands	8
Men's Volleyball Thailand League	2005	Volleyball	Thailand	8
Women's Volleyball Thailand League	2005	Volleyball	Thailand	8
Indian Ice Hockey Championship	2005	Ice Hockey	India	N/A
Men's V-League (South Korea)	2005	Volleyball	South Korea	7
Women's V-League (South Korea)	2005	Volleyball	South Korea	7
National T20 Cup	2005	Cricket	Pakistan	6
Futsal Thai League	2006	Futsal	Thailand	14
Indonesia Pro Futsal League	2006	Futsal	Indonesia	12
Syed Mushtaq Ali Trophy	2006	Cricket	India	38
Bangladesh Premier League	2007	Football	Bangladesh	12
F.League	2007	Futsal	Japan	12
I-League	2007	Football	India	13
Kowsar Women Football League	2007	Football	Iran	10
A-League Women	2008	Football	Australia	12
Indian Premier League	2008	Cricket	India	10
I-League 2nd Division	2008	Football	India	8
Liga 1 (Indonesia)	2008	Football	Indonesia	18
Krush	2008	Kickboxing	Japan	-
Pakistan Cup	2008	Cricket	Pakistan	6
FK-League	2009	Futsal	South Korea	12
Maharaja Trophy T20	2009	Cricket	India	6
Myanmar National League	2009	Football	Myanmar	12
Philippine Golf Tour	2009	Golf	Philippines	-
Thai Women's League	2009	Football	Thailand	10
WK League	2009	Football	South Korea	8
Road Fighting Championship	2010	Mixed Martial Arts	South Korea	-
Ahmad Shah Abdali 4-Day Tournament	2011	Cricket	Afghanistan	4
Handball Korea League	2011	Handball	South Korea	6
Hong Kong Premiership	2011	Rugby Union	Hong Kong	6
ONE Championship	2011	Mixed Martial Arts	Thailand; Philippines; Malaysia; India; Indonesia; United States; Japan; China; Singapore; Vietnam; Myanmar (European Union) Europe; Brazil; South Korea; Australia	-
Sikkim Premier Division League	2011	Football	India	8
Elite Football League of India	2012 (inactive)	American football	India	23
Asia Winter Baseball League	2012	Baseball	Japan; South Korea; Taiwan	4~6
Bangladesh Championship League	2012	Football	Bangladesh	12
Bangladesh Premier League (Twenty20)	2012	Cricket	Bangladesh	7
Bhutan Premier League	2012	Football	Bhutan	10
Brunei Super League	2012	Football	Brunei	13
Indonesia Women's Pro Futsal League	2012	Futsal	Indonesia	7
Super Fight League	2012	Mixed Martial Arts	India	-
League of Legends Champions Korea	2012	eSports	South Korea	10
Mizoram Premier League	2012	Football	India	8
Thailand Basketball League	2012	Basketball	Thailand	Varies
UAE Warriors	2012	Mixed Martial Arts	United Arab Emirates	-
Premier Badminton League	2013	Badminton	India	6
Golf Premier League	2013 (defunct)	Golf	India	8
Indian Super League	2013	Football	India	13
J3 League	2013	Football	Japan	20
Hockey India League	2013	Field Hockey	India	6
K League 2	2013	Football	South Korea	13
Kerala Premier League	2013	Football	India	22
Ladies Philippine Golf Tour	2013	Golf	Philippines	-
Shpageeza Cricket League	2013	Cricket	Afghanistan	8
Tencent League of Legends Pro League	2013	eSports	China	17
UAE National Basketball League	2013	Basketball	United Arab Emirates	10
3x3.EXE Premier	2014	Basketball (3x3)	Australia; Japan; New Zealand; Thailand; Vietnam	90
3x3 Australia	2014	Basketball (3x3)	Australia	14
Dhivehi Premier League	2014	Football	Maldives	8
Hong Kong Premier League	2014	Football	Hong Kong	10
League of Legends Japan League	2014	eSports	Japan	8
Vietnam eSports Champions League	2014	eSports	Vietnam	12
Pro Kabaddi League	2014	Kabaddi	India	12
Kunlun Fight	2014	Kickboxing	China	-
Taiwan Mulan Football League	2014	Football	Taiwan	8
Liga Futebol Amadora Primeira Divisão	2015	Football	Timor-Leste	10
Liga Futebol Amadora Segunda Divisão	2015	Football	Timor-Leste	10
Pakistan Super League	2015	Cricket	Pakistan	8
ESL India Premiership	2015	eSports	India	1000+
Rizin Fighting Federation	2015	Mixed Martial Arts	Japan	-
B.League	2016	Basketball	Japan	24
Bad Bull Softball League	2016	Softball	India	8
Bhutan Women's National League	2016	Football	Bhutan	6
Brave Combat Federation	2016	Mixed Martial Arts	Bahrain	-
East Asia Super League	2016	Basketball	Philippines; South Korea; Japan; Taiwan; Macau; Hong Kong; Mongolia	12
Everest Premier League	2016	Cricket	Nepal	6
iCG e-Sports Summer League	2016	eSports	Iran	12
Indian eSports Championship	2016	eSports	India	100+
Indian Women's League	2016	Football	India	8
International Lethwei Federation Japan	2016	Lethwei	Japan	-
Tamil Nadu Premier League	2016	Cricket	India	8
Vietnam Basketball Association	2016	Basketball	Vietnam	6
3x3 Pro Basketball League	2017	Basketball (3x3)	India	18
Asia Professional Baseball Championship	2017	Baseball	Japan; South Korea; Taiwan; Australia	4
Ghazi Amanullah Khan Regional One Day Tournament	2017	Cricket	Afghanistan	8
Liga 2 (Indonesia)	2017	Football	Indonesia	26
Maharlika Pilipinas Basketball League	2017	Basketball	Philippines	26
Philippines Football League	2017	Football	Philippines	10
Premier Volleyball League	2017	Volleyball	Philippines	9
Taiwan Football Premier League	2017	Football	Taiwan	8
Thai League 3	2017	Football	Thailand	72
Ultimate Table Tennis	2017	Table Tennis	India	6
MPL Philippines	2018	eSports	Philippines	8
Super Kabaddi League	2018	Kabaddi	Pakistan	10
T.League	2018	Table Tennis	Japan	10
National Basketball League	2018	Basketball	Philippines	Varies
Malaysia A1 Semi-Pro League	2019	Football	Malaysia	14
Matrix Fight Night	2019	Mixed Martial Arts	India	-
Mirwais Nika 3-Day Tournament	2019	Cricket	Afghanistan	5
NBL1	2019	Basketball	Australia	74
League of Legends Pacific Championship Series	2019	eSports	Taiwan; Hong Kong; Singapore; Philippines	10
K3 League	2020	Football	South Korea	16
K4 League	2020	Football	South Korea	16
Kerala Super League	2020	Cricket	India	6
Lanka Premier League	2020	Cricket	Sri Lanka	5
P.League+	2020	Basketball	Taiwan	4
Professional Chess Association of the Philippines	2020	Chess	Philippines	18
Taiwan Second Division Football League	2020	Football	Taiwan	7
WE League	2020	Football	Japan	12
3x3 Thai League	2021	Basketball (3x3)	Thailand	18
Afghanistan Champions League	2021	Football	Afghanistan	12
AsiaBasket	2021	Basketball	Philippines	Varies
Futsal Club Championship	2021	Futsal	India	14
Indian National Basketball League	2021	Basketball	India	6
Prime Volleyball League	2021	Volleyball	India	8
Pilipinas Super League	2021	Basketball	Philippines	Varies
Sri Lanka Super League	2021	Football	Sri Lanka	10
Tauihi Basketball Aotearoa	2021	Basketball	New Zealand	5
Baseball United	2022	Baseball	India; Pakistan; United Arab Emirates	4
Elite Pro Basketball League	2022	Basketball	India	12
Green Afghanistan One Day Cup	2022	Cricket	Afghanistan	4
Japan Diamond Softball League	2022	Softball	Japan	16
Major Basketball League Malaysia	2022	Basketball	Malaysia	5
National Super League 4-Day Tournament	2022	Cricket	Sri Lanka	5
Nepal T20 League	2022	Cricket	Nepal	6
Saudi Women's Premier League	2022	Football	Saudi Arabia	10
Saudi Women's First Division League	2022	Football	Saudi Arabia	10
Ultimate Kho Kho	2022	Kho Kho	India	6
West Asia Super League	2022	Basketball	Lebanon; United Arab Emirates; Iran; Oman; Syria; Jordan; Iraq; Saudi Arabia; Kuwait; Palestine; Qatar; Bahrain; Kazakhstan; India	14
Chinese Women's Ice Hockey League	2023	Ice hockey	China	7
Hanif Mohammad Trophy	2023	Cricket	Pakistan	10
I-League 3	2023	Football	India	24
Indian Women's League 2	2023	Football	India	15
PBA Esports Bakbakan	2023	eSports	Philippines	12
The League (Mongolia)	2023	Basketball	Mongolia	10
Women's Premier League	2023	Cricket	India	5
Women's Kabaddi League	2023	Kabaddi	India	8
Pro Panja League	2023	Arm wrestling	India	6
AFC Champions League Two	2024	Football	Asia	32
AFC Challenge League	2024	Football	Asia	20
Champions One-Day Cup	2024	Cricket	Pakistan	5
Champions Pentagular	2024	Cricket	Pakistan	5
Champions T20 Cup	2024	Cricket	Pakistan	5
Qosh Tepa National T20 Cup	2024	Cricket	Afghanistan	5
Sharks Billiards Association	2024	Billiards	Philippines	6
SV.League Men	2024	Volleyball	Japan	10
SV.League Women	2024	Volleyball	Japan	14
Taiwan Professional Basketball League	2024	Basketball	Taiwan	7
The Asian Tournament	2024	Basketball	Asia	Varies
Women's Maharlika Pilipinas Basketball League	2024	Basketball	Philippines	6
Chinese Professional Baseball	2025	Baseball	China	6
Maharlika Pilipinas Pickleball Tour	2026	Pickleball	Philippines	12
Major League Pickleball Asia	2026	Pickleball	China; Hong Kong; Japan; Philippines; Malaysia; Vietnam	6
Philippine Women's Open	2026	Tennis	Philippines	-
Pickle Yard Conference League	2026	Pickleball	Philippines	8
