= Association football in Asia =

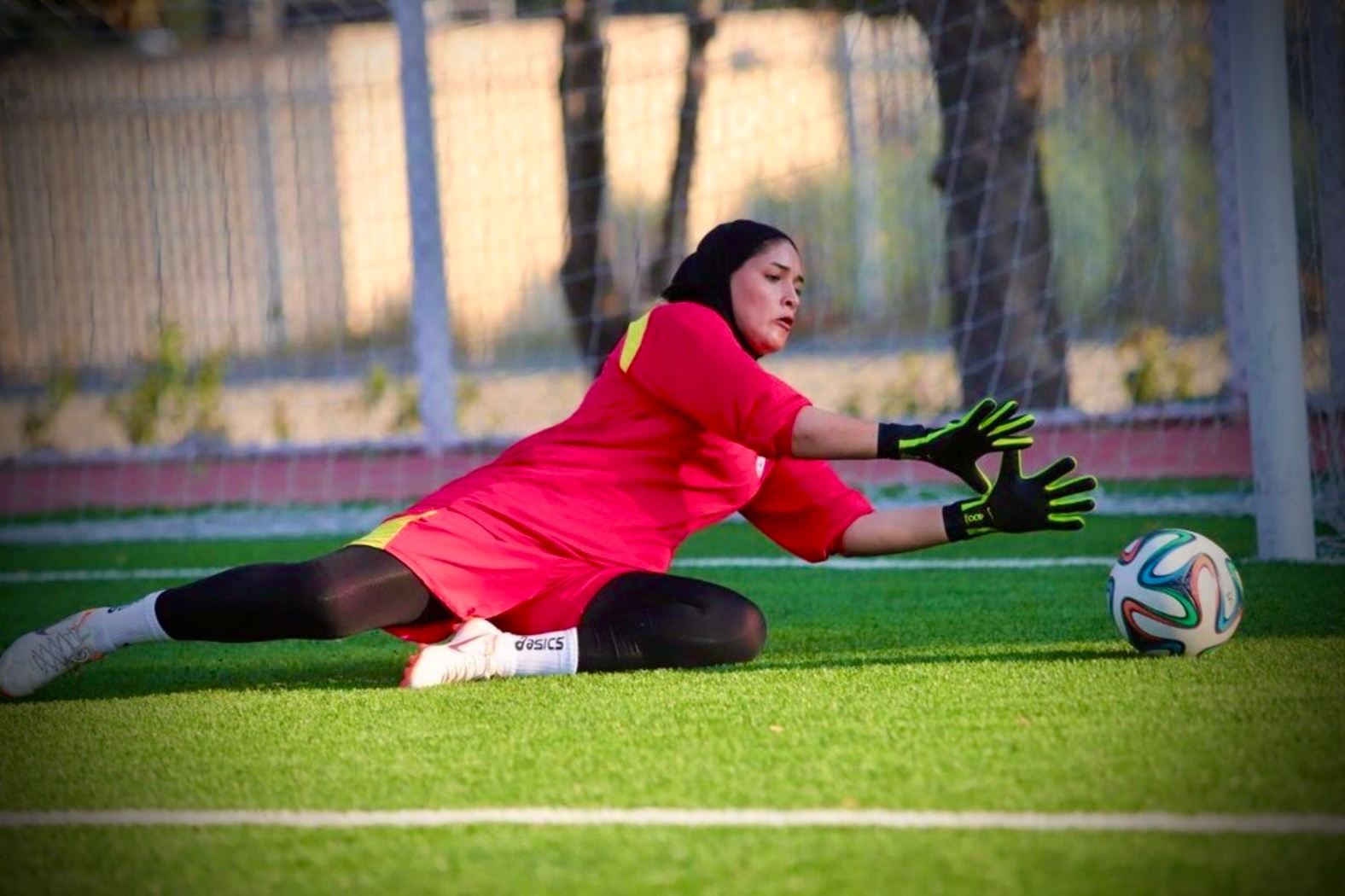
- An Iranian female goalkeeper in training
- Sport: Football
- Continent: Asia
- Most recent champion: Qatar
- Most titles: Japan
- Website: www.the-afc.com

According to FIFA (Federation Internationale de Football Association), the earliest form of football (soccer) was played in China and it was dated back to centuries. The game was called cuju and it was played as the same way as football - without using hands or arms and a player had to kick the ball through two goal posts to score a goal where the ball was made of leather.

Football in Asia is enormously diversified and it banks on various surroundings and periods. During the 21st century, football is emerging as a prominent sport in the Asian countries, with Qatar hosting the 2022 FIFA World Cup, India introducing the Super League in 2013 and Qatar and the United Arab Emirates' huge investment in clubs overseas.

Asia has the largest fan following of football than any other continent which is approximately 800 million or around 17% of all Asians and it also exhibits 32% of the viewership for the English Premier League.

The former President of FIFA, for the year 1998–2005, Sepp Blatter asserted his confidence that the future of football must lie in Asia because half of the world's population is in Asia. The official slogan of the Asian Football Confederation is ‘The Future is Asia’, and the AFC aims to develop football in Asia even more in the coming years.

== Japan's growing status in football ==
Football is the second most popular sport in Japan and Japan currently ranks 15th in the Men's FIFA world rankings.

Before the 1980s Japan was undistinguished as a football team and it was not considered to be one of the powerhouses in football. This was before a former American football player, Tom Byer, who retired after a short career in football mainly in Asia, took in charge of the youth development department of the Japan National football team.

Since then, Japan has qualified for the last 6 FIFA World Cups and they also managed to win four out of the last six Asian Football Cups and because of their success, the Japanese National team is now considered as one of the top football teams in Asia. Also Japan and South Korea together hosted the 2002 FIFA World Cup.

Japan's J1 League became visible as one of the most popular and prominent soccer leagues internationally during the 1990s.

Japan's national women's football team also showed their dominance beating the USA women's national team in the 2011 World Cup Final in penalty shoot-outs.

== South Korea's gaining popularity in football ==
Ranked 23rd in the world in football according to the Men's FIFA World ranking, South Korea is capturing attention from all over the world as the biggest powerhouse in Asia. It is one among the six teams to qualify for the world cup eight consecutive times and now it has qualified for the world cup nine consecutive times. Heung-Min Son is currently the leading scorer in the South Korean national team and is on the rise in the English Premier League.

South Korea finished fourth after their defeat against Turkey in the 2002 World Cup which is the closest any Asian team has ever come to winning the World Cup.

Jeonbuk FC is a South Korean football club and it is the top football club in Asia.

In the 2018 FIFA World cup, despite the fact that the South Korean national team failed to qualify for the round of 16, they knocked out the defending World champions, Germany, out of the world cup in the group stages with Heung-Min Son's 96th-minute goal. Heung-Min Son is the captain of the South Korean National team and he plays for Tottenham Hotspurs in the English Premier League. Son's presence in the English Premier League has brought people's attention to South Korean football. Son also competed on the biggest stage of football, the UEFA Champions League Final with Tottenham Hotspurs against Liverpool FC on 2 June 2019. Besides all this, Son has also received Tottenham's 2018/19 Player of the Season Award and he was named the London Premier League 2019 Player of the Year. He also received Tottenham's Goal of the Season Award for 2018/19.

Son drove South Korea to win the gold medal in the 2018 Asian Games which were held in Indonesia and received a dispensation from South Korea's mandatory 21-month military service for all men in Korea aged between 18 and 28.

Another big name in South Korean football was Park Ji-Sung who played for teams like Manchester United, PSV and Queens Park Rangers. He announced his retirement in 2014 and he's currently a global ambassador for Manchester United.

== Development of football in India and China ==
Football is the second most popular sport in India. Chhetri, one of the best players of India, with 84 goals from 129 appearances, was awarded the Padma Shri recently. He is also the country's most capped player. Besides winning the football tournament at the Asian games 1951 and 1962 against Iran and South Korea respectively, India has not had any significant post success, and has not managed to qualify for the FIFA world cup in over 60 years. Though, their best performance in continental level is finishing as runner-up at the 1964 AFC Asian Cup.

In 2009, two IIT Delhi students- Kishore Taid and Anurag Khilnani who were also football enthusiasts started working to drift people's attention towards football in India and they realized that for India to qualify for the World Cup in the future, every school in India needs to have a training academy. So along with the torchbearer of Indian football, Bhaichang Bhutia they founded the Bhaichang Bhutia Football Schools (BFFS) in August 2010. BFFS is now a 4-star rated academy which participates in all AIFF Youth Leagues and has 60 training centers at present.

India hosted the 2017 FIFA Under-17 world cup. India is the fifth Asian country to host the FIFA world cup. It was the first time that India hosted a FIFA tournament and India also became the first Asian country since 2013, to host the U-17 World cup. According to FIFA president Gianni Infantino, India will be the host of the 2020 U-17 FIFA Women's World cup.

The FIFA committee and the Government of India are conceptualizing an ambitious plan called Mission Eleven Million. The program was launched on 6 February 2017. It is a football program that commits to reach out to 11 million school kids and change the viewpoint towards football at the school level. Its aim is to reach 12,000 schools all across the country.

China is currently 74nd in the Men's FIFA world ranking.

The prominence of the Chinese super league has been increased in the past 2 years. The Chinese super league attracted players from all over the world and is one of the biggest footballing markets in the world. China has been investing a lot on Football with Wang Jianlin, Asia's richest man, acquiring a twenty percent stake in the Spanish football club- Atletico Madrid. Other Chinese investors have also been investing in football by buying Espanyol in Spain and also some other football clubs in France and the Netherlands as well. In the 2017 winter transfer window, the 16 teams in the Chinese super league spent 331 million pounds while the 20 teams in the English Premier League spent a total of 215 million pounds on the acquisition of players. China recently announced its desire to create 50,000 new football youth academies by the year 2025.

Xi Jinping, the General Secretary of the Chinese Communist Party since 2012, has had fond interest in football. He is putting football in the center of his plans as he wants China to qualify for, host, and win the football World Cup at least once before the year 2050.

Since 2013, the Chinese club, Guangzhou Evergrande has won the Asian Champions League twice in 2013 and 2015 and thus, qualified for the FIFA's Club World Cup. They lost to Barcelona in the 2015 Club World Cup tournament and Bayern Munich in 2013. Guangzhou Evergrande are seven-time Chinese Super League champions, the most championships won than any other team in the league.

== Football culture in Iran ==
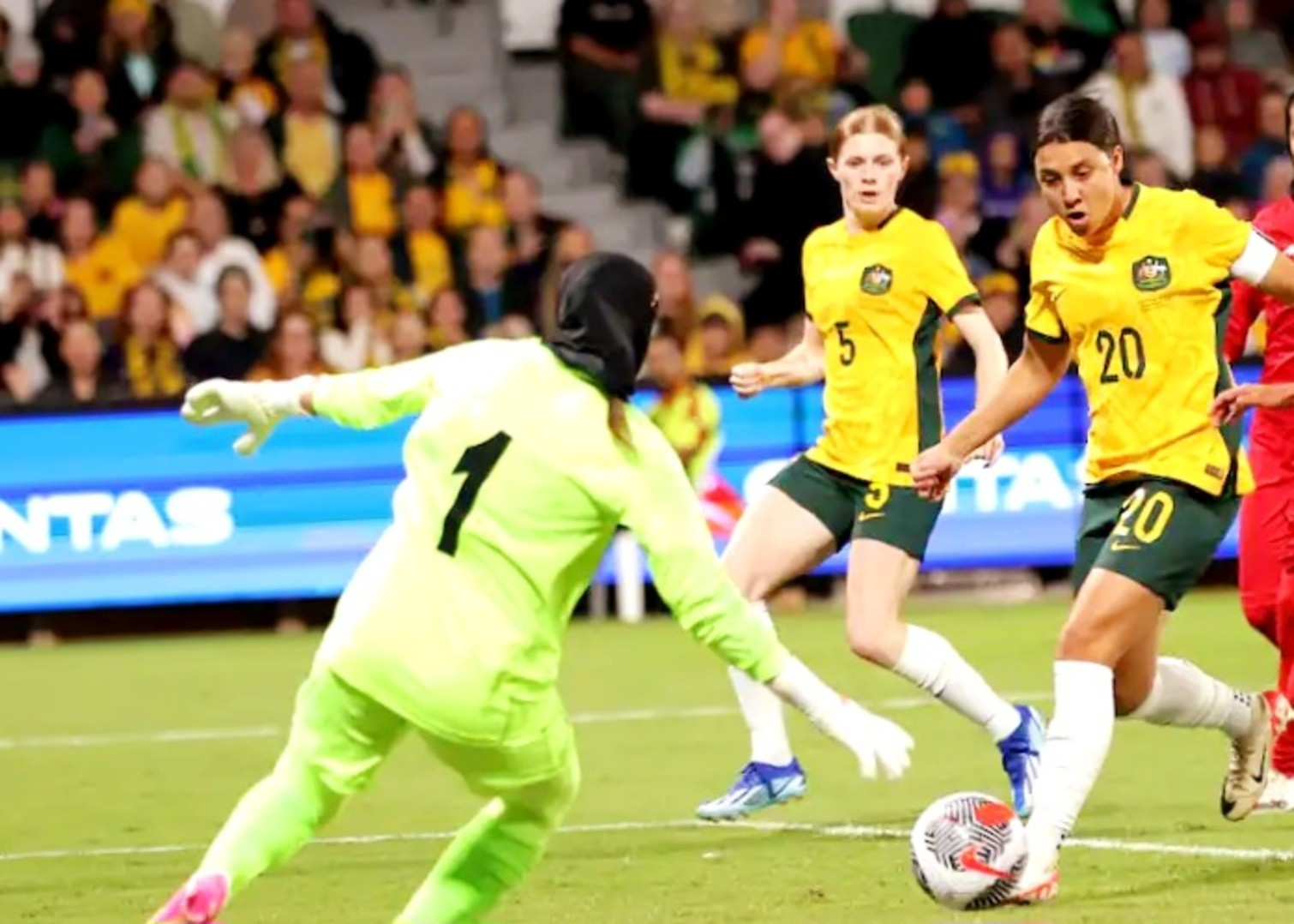
Iran v Australia. Women's football is rapidly increasing its popularity in Iran.

Football is the most popular sport in Iran, with wrestling and volleyball as close contenders. Football has been a part of life for Iranians for many decades now and is played in schools, streets, and football clubs nationwide.

For political and social reasons, women's football grew little from the 1980s to 2020, and clubs such as Persepolis and Esteghlal did not even have a women's football team in these years. But the progress of the women's national team helped to strengthen the domestic women's league. The Kowsar Women Football League (Persian: لیگ کوثر بانوان فوتبال ایران, Lig-e Kâuser-e Banuan-e Futbal-e Iran) is a women's football league, run by the Football Federation Islamic Republic of Iran. At the top of the Iranian football league system, it is the country's primary competition for the sport. It was established in 2007. There is also a second division for women's.

== Football in other countries of Asia ==
=== Qatar ===
Qatar is ranked at 55th in world football and they are the Asian Champions of 2019 defeating Japan 3–1 in the tournament final. Qatar's defender Abdelkarim Hassan was named the Asian Player of the Year for 2018.

Al Duhail SC in Qatar is the second best football club in Asia.

=== Saudi Arabia ===
Football is the most popular sport in Saudi Arabia. Saudi Arabia is ranked 72nd in the world in football.

In 2012, Saudi Arabia sent female athletes to the Olympics for the first time in their history and the women who represented the nation were- Sarah Attar and Wodjan Ali Seraj Abdulrahim Shahrkhani. Despite this, women in Saudi Arabia are at a disadvantage as they do not possess proper sports equipment and some of the women grew up even without basic physical education and no access to the gyms which is supported by Rawh Abdullah, the captain of Challenge, which is a soccer club in Riyadh, in her statement in which she says that she wants to become a great athlete but she cannot do so without the basic equipment. The football team, Challenge, used to practice football in a friend's backyard.

The Saudi Arabian women have watched football in a stadium for the first time in 2018. All women were allowed to enter the stadiums in three cities- Riyadh, Dammam and Jeddah.

=== Indonesia ===
Football is one of the most popular sports in Indonesia. Indonesia is currently ranked at 149th in the FIFA rankings.

Indonesia was the first-ever Asian team to qualify for the FIFA World cup when it was held in 1938. Indonesia qualified for the World cup after Japan had to withdraw from the competition.

In 2012, the Indonesian national team went through a FIFA investigation after the team lost a World Cup Qualifier against Bahrain with a score of 10–0. A result so one-sided aroused suspicion and led FIFA to investigate into the matter.

Football in Indonesia is violent and the Indonesian football association has recorded around 95 deaths since the year 2005. These deaths occurred from stabbing, stampedes, vehicles, tear gas and also from fireworks explosion. Seven people who died in the last six years were the victims of supporters of two arch-rival clubs- Persija and Persib

Due to the violence, the Indonesian soccer club players are transported to and from the stadiums in armored personnel carriers.

Perslb Bandung, an Indonesian soccer club had the highest social media following with 15.92 million in 2018, in Asia with most of its followers coming from Facebook

== Attendances ==
The AFC clubs with an average home league attendance of at least 20,000 in the 2024-25 and 2025 seasons:

#	Club	Country	Average
1	Dalian Yingbo	China	58,268
2	Beijing Guoan	China	44,975
3	Tractor Club	Iran	44,071
4	Chengdu Rongcheng	China	40,820
5	Shanghai Shenhua	China	37,505
6	Urawa Red Diamonds	Japan	37,350
7	Mohun Bagan	India	35,744
8	Al-Ittihad	Saudi Arabia	34,960
9	Nagoya Grampus	Japan	32,263
10	FC Tokyo	Japan	31,590
11	Persepolis	Iran	30,000
12	Gamba Osaka	Japan	29,924
13	Shandong Taishan	China	27,863
14	Kashima Antlers	Japan	27,401
15	Yokohama F. Marinos	Japan	26,578
16	Sanfrecce Hiroshima	Japan	25,585
17	Zhejiang FC	China	25,513
18	Tianjin Jinmen Tiger	China	25,097
19	Shenzhen Peng City	China	23,525
20	FC Seoul	South Korea	23,185
21	Albirex Niigata	Japan	22,601
22	Qingdao Hainiu	China	22,504
23	Yunnan Yukun	China	22,175
24	Kawasaki Frontale	Japan	22,050
25	Tokyo Verdy	Japan	21,121
26	Vissel Kobe	Japan	21,099
27	Al-Ahli SFC	Saudi Arabia	20,825

Sources: League pages on Wikipedia

== See also ==
- Sports in Asia
- Asian Football Confederation
