= Asia Cup (disambiguation) =

The Asia Cup is an international cricket tournament organised by the Asian Cricket Council.

Asia Cup may also refer to:

- Asia Cup Moot, an international moot court competition
- FIBA Asia Cup, international basketball tournaments run by FIBA Asia
- Men's Hockey Asia Cup, an international men's field hockey tournament run by the Asian Hockey Federation
- Women's Hockey Asia Cup, an international women's field hockey tournament run by the Asian Hockey Federation
- Men's Hockey Junior Asia Cup, an international men's under-21 field hockey tournament run by the Asian Hockey Federation
- Women's Hockey Junior Asia Cup, an international women's under-21 field hockey tournament run by the Asian Hockey Federation
- Women's Asia Cup, an international women's cricket tournament

== See also ==
- AFC Asian Cup, an international men's association football tournament run by the Asian Football Confederation (AFC)
- AFC Women's Asian Cup, the women's version of the above association football competition
- Asian TV Cup, Go competition
- Asian Cup (ice hockey)
- Asian Cup Table Tennis Tournament
