= Salik Lucknawi =

Indian writer (1913–2013)

- Born: Salik Lucknawi; 16 December 1913; Lucknow
- Died: 4 January 2013; Kolkata
- Occupations: poet, journalist
- Children: Shamim Kapoor, Wasim Kapoor, Yasmin, Salim Kapoor, Kalim Kapoor, Jolly Kapoor and Shahla
- Writing career
- Notable awards: Padma Shri

Salik Lucknawi (16 December 1913 – 4 January 2013) was the nom de plume of Shaukat Riaz Kapoor, an Indian Urdu poet and journalist. He was a recipient of the civilian honour of the Padma Shri.

== Early life ==
Salik Lucknawi was born on 16 December 1913 in Lucknow. His father Tulsi Ram Kapoor converted to Islam and changed his name to Tareq Riaz Kapoor, four years before his birth. Lucknawi received a BA from St. Xavier's College, Kolkata and a BCom from City College, Kolkata and studied Persian at Lucknow University. In 1938, he was one of the founder members of the Progressive Writers Movement in West Bengal. His first collection of stories, Azra Aur Deegar Afsane came out in 1941. He was drawn to the vortex of the Quit India Movement in 1942 and spent 13 months in jail. In 1956 he started Abshaar and he was its chief editor till his death. Lucknawi also headed the Calcutta Muslim Orphanage for children and women. He founded the CMO High School and steered the Anjuman Taraqqui-e-Urdu. He served Kolkata Municipal Corporation as Alderman (1985–1990).

== Poetry ==
Mere thakaan ko kyon maut kehte ho yaaron / Ek zara angrai li, kasmasai, aur so gaye. (Friends, why do you call my fatigue death / I tossed, turned and fell asleep).

=== Published collection of Urdu poetry ===
- Azra Aur Deegar Afsane
- Be-Sar-O-Pa (Preposterous)
