= I1 Super Series =

Planned motor racing competition

i1 Super Series
- Category: Single seater
- Country: India
- Inaugural season: cancelled
- Constructors: Radical Sportscars
- Official website: www.i1superseries.com

i1 Super Series (also known as Indian Racing League) was a proposed single-make, single-seater sports car racing series. The inaugural series was planned for 2012 but was subsequently delayed until the 2013 season. The races would have been held at FIA approved motorsport circuits around Asia.

Organized by Machdar Motorsports Private Limited, the series was seeking sanction by the Fédération Internationale de l'Automobile (FIA) and the Federation of Motor Sports Clubs of India (FMSCI).

== Format ==
The Series Logo

All teams would have raced with the Radical Sportscars SR3 roadster.

The i1 Super Series would have consisted of ten races at five circuits. Nine teams representing different Indian cities would have competed in the inaugural season to be held in 2013. Each team would be represented by two drivers, at least one of whom would have been a certified Indian driver. Teams would have competed for a USD $1,000,000 prize.

== Teams and drivers ==
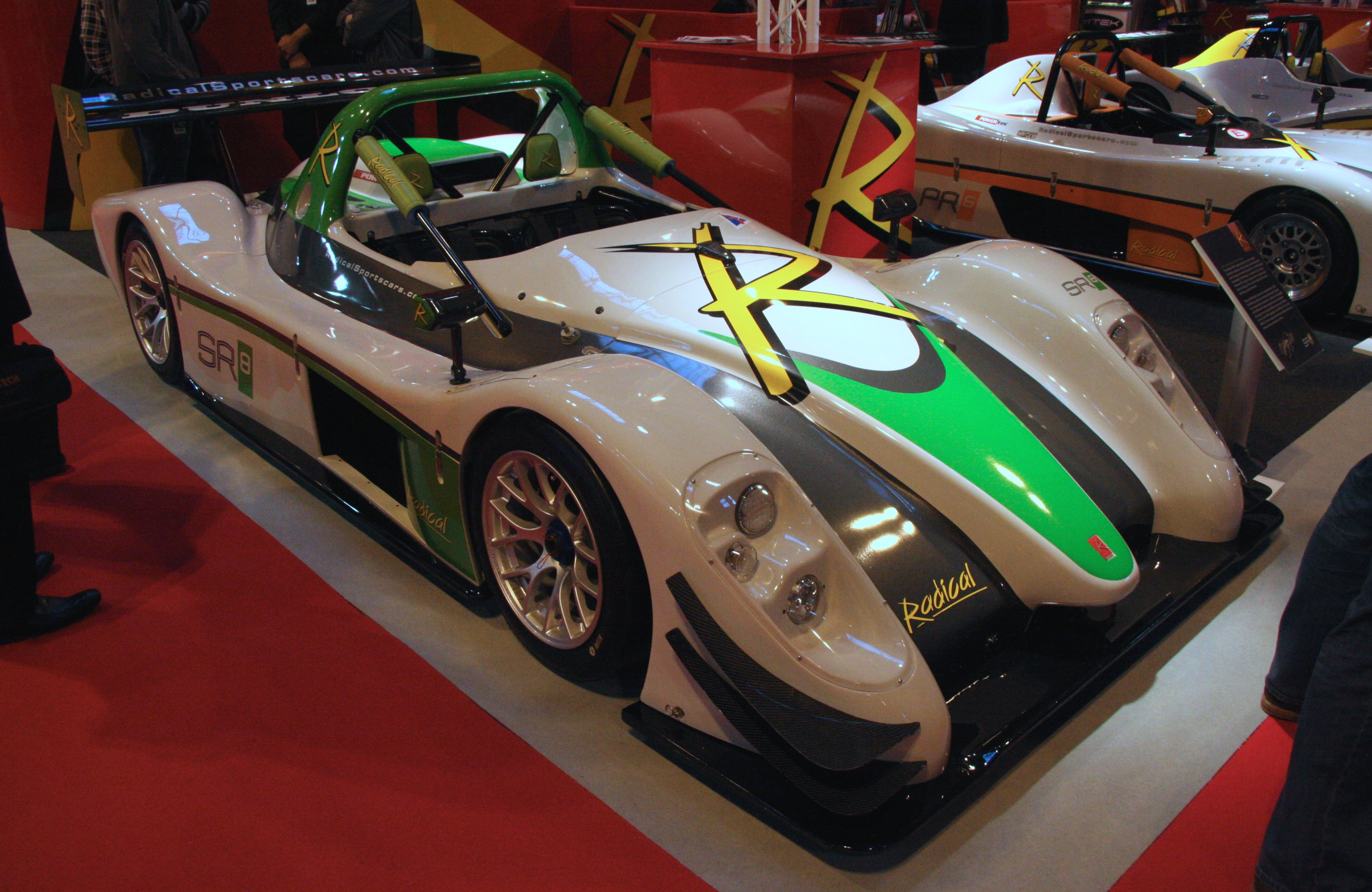
The Radical SR8

Teams would enter the i1 Super Series by way of a franchise, held in the name of the city that they represent. Each franchise would entitle a team to enter three drivers into the championship. Seven franchises were established, with two yet to be set up in Goa and Ahmedabad.

=== Driver entries ===
The i1 Super Series confirmed a driver roster during the series launch at Yas Marina in December 2011, though no drivers were assigned to individual teams. Instead, drivers were placed into a pool, with teams selecting their drivers ahead of each round in the championship.

Subsequent delays to a 2012 season to 2013 would have required a new roster.

== Broadcaster ==
Sports broadcaster Ten Sports was named as the official broadcast partner of the i1 Super Series, and would have broadcast live coverage of all the races.
