= Asian Cup (ice hockey) =

Ice hockey tournament

The Asian Cup was an ice hockey tournament featuring national teams from the continent of Asia from 1992 to 1995. It was organized by the International Ice Hockey Federation.

== History ==
The first tournament was scheduled to be played in February 1991, but it was moved to January 1992 due to the Second Gulf War. Four teams participated in the tournament, held in Obihiro, with Japan winning by virtue of defeating China in the final. The same four teams participated in the 1993 tournament, held in Sapporo. It was again won by Japan, which finished the tournament undefeated. The tournament was not held in 1994, but resumed in 1995, this time being held in Seoul. Kazakhstan, which made their debut at this tournament, was victorious with a perfect 3–0 record.

== Champions ==
- 1992 Japan
- 1993 Japan
- 1995 Kazakhstan

== Medal table ==
Country	Gold	Silver	Bronze	Medals
Japan	2	1	0	3
Kazakhstan	1	0	0	1
China	0	1	1	2
North Korea	0	1	1	2
South Korea	0	0	1	1

== Results ==
=== 1992 ===
==== First round ====
Pl.	Country	GP	W	T	L	GF–GA	Pts
1.	Japan	3	3	0	0	18:9	6:0
2.	China	3	2	0	1	24:10	4:2
3.	North Korea	3	0	1	2	8:15	1:5
4.	South Korea	3	0	1	2	7:23	1:5

==== Final round ====
3rd place

February 19, 1992	North Korea	14–1 (8:0, 2:1, 4:0)	South Korea	Obihiro

Final

February 19, 1992	Japan	9–3 (2:1, 2:2, 5:0)	China	Obihiro

=== 1993 ===
Pl.	Country	GP	W	T	L	GF–GA	Pts
1.	Japan	3	3	0	0	26:3	6:0
2.	North Korea	3	2	0	1	14:13	4:2
3.	South Korea	3	1	0	2	8:17	2:4
4.	China	3	0	0	3	6:21	0:6

=== 1995 ===
Pl.	Country	GP	W	T	L	GF–GA	Pts
1.	Kazakhstan	3	3	0	0	12:3	6:0
2.	Japan	3	2	0	1	15:9	4:2
3.	China	3	0	1	2	7:14	1:5
4.	South Korea	3	0	1	2	4:14	1:5
