= 2013 drought in Maharashtra =

Natural disaster in India

The 2013 drought in Maharashtra in India came after the region received lower rainfall during the monsoon season June to September 2012. It is considered as the region's worst drought in 40 years. The worst-hit areas in Maharashtra were Solapur, Parbhani, Ahmednagar, Latur, Pune, Satara, Beed and Nashik. Residents of Latur, Osmanabad, Nanded, Aurangabad, Jalna, Jalgaon and Dhule districts were also affected by this famine.

== Geographical and physical impact ==
Map of India with Maharashtra State in red.

In January 2013, the Indian government reported that 7,896 villages in Maharashtra were affected by drought. In a region near the Bhima River in Maharashtra, the years leading up to the drought in 2013 recorded below average annual rainfall: in 2011, slightly below average, and in 2012, the lowest since 2003. In May 2013, the lowest groundwater levels were recorded since May 2005. The low rainfall and groundwater appears to have been worsened by improper water resource management.

With approximately 80% of drinking water sources in Maharashtra dependent on ground water sources, the drought led to a situation of drinking water scarcity in Maharashtra. The drought also negatively affected agriculture, decreasing production of staple foods, ranging from 5 to 21%, as compared to the previous year. This decreased production led to an increase in food prices across India and a decrease of India's GDP by 0.5% (US$9 billion) in 2012.

Of 223 farming households surveyed, over 60% reported crop losses and over 20% reported loss of livestock because of the drought. Multiple farmers moved to urban areas in search in work. Others effectively used reserves of food, water and money to survive.

== Response ==
=== Government ===
The Indian government allocated almost half of its disaster budget to relief efforts. The Government's Empowered Group of Ministers provided INR ₹12.07 billion for relief, including 2,136 water tankers supplying 1,663 villages. However, due to increased numbers of starving livestock, a further INR ₹11.6 billion was allocated to the agricultural sector for scarcity mitigation, supplying water and fodder. There was criticism of the government regarding water allocation, with disproportionate quantities being used to grow sugarcane in Maharashtra. The government was also criticized for its lack of regulation to prevent future droughts. Following the drought, the government committed to improving the maintenance of dams, rivers and other infrastructure.

=== Non-Profit ===
The Yuva Foundation (formerly: Maharashtra Drought Relief Project) was a youth-led initiative set up by Soham Sawalkar and Aditya Sureka to assist in the drought response. They distributed food, water and fodder, as well as providing materials such as PVC pipes to install water solutions for villages.

In June 2013, Church Auxiliary for Social Action (CASA), the humanitarian and development arm of Indian Churches, announced their plans to assist in the relief efforts by aiming to raise US$264,504 from donors. This included the provision of livestock fodder, manure and seeds, agricultural and advocacy training programs, and raising water management and disaster risk reduction awareness.

== Consequences ==
=== Nutrition, sanitation, water ===
With a significant decrease in agricultural yield except for milk, oil seeds and cotton production, food security was a concern. A study of 223 households found that just over half of the respondents had access to water for sanitation while 83.8% of the 66.4% who had access to toilets, used them. While priority was given to providing water quantity over quality, water samples tested detected beyond permissible limits of nitrate-nitrogen, ammonium-nitrogen, and chlorides.

=== Mental health ===
Due to the stress and burden of economic losses faced by farmers, specifically along the cotton belt, suicide rates increased between 2011 and 2015 (1,495-2,016 deaths). However, in 2013 this trend reversed due to adequate rainfall in the second half of the year (1,298). With the continuing drought-like conditions following 2012–2013, suicide among farmers continues to have a devastating effect. Maharashtra has become known as the `graveyard of farmers´.

=== Other: migration, education, desertification process ===
With water scarcity and loss of employment, seasonal and permanent migration increased, usually towards urban cities. Five hundred thousand workers migrated from Marathwada to western Maharashtra. Water collection was usually done by women and children, which was exacerbated by the drought and migration of men, in turn decreasing children's attendance in school. The desertification process, including recurring droughts, is a long-term consequence that could severely impact future societies and human health.
