= Operation Amla =

Operation Amla was a 48-hour terrorist-attack drill/mockup that took place across 13 coastal districts in Tamil Nadu, India on 20 and 21 June 2013. The operation was designed to test their emergency preparedness during terrorist infiltration. More than 300 personnel of the Tamil Nadu Police and Indian Coast Guard(Eastern Region) conducted the drill across the Eastern coast beginning from Chennai to Kanyakumari. Security was tightened at East Coast Road, Chennai Airport and Coastal regions.
