= 2013 South Asian Games =

XII South Asian Games
- Host city: canceled
- Nations: N/A
- Athletes: N/A
- Events: canceled

The 2013 South Asian Games, officially the XII South Asian Games, was a scheduled multi-sport event to take place in Guwahati and Shillong, India. With this edition of the Games, India became the second country to host the Games three times (the previous editions being held in Kolkata in 1987 and Madras in 1995), after Bangladesh. It was also the first time that Delhi hosted the Games. The Games witnessed a change in the original host country, and faced delays which pushed back the conduct of the Games by several months.

== Host change ==
Originally, as per tradition of bringing the Games to each and every country of South Asia, Bhutan was selected to host the 12th edition of the Games. However, at the 41st South Asian Olympic Council held at Dhaka in February 2010, Bhutan expressed its inability to host the Games. So, to replace Bhutan, Delhi stepped in as host of the Games. Indian Olympic Association President Suresh Kalmadi officially received the SAG flag in Dhaka after the 11th edition of the Games drew to a close on 9 February 2010. The Sports Ministry of India said, in an official press statement, that Delhi had been chosen as host so that the sport infrastructure built for the 2010 Commonwealth Games remains in use.

== Delay ==
Initially, the Games were expected to be held in October, 2012. However, during the General Body meeting of the Indian Olympic Association (IOA) on 16 December 2011, it was decided to postpone the Games to February, 2013. The primary concern highlighted was that the original plan meant that the Games would be held only two months after the 2012 Summer Olympics, a fact which made athletes uncomfortable. In addition, the Delhi Government had stated that "accommodation would be a problem during October–November". In April 2012, the IOA sent letters to all the National Olympic Committees (NOCs) of South Asia, announcing that the Games will be held for eight days beginning from 13 February 2013; further discussions would take place at an all-NOC meeting in Moscow. President of the Nepal Olympic Committee Dhruba Bahadur Pradhan also reported about the proposed additions of fencing, equestrian, gymnastics and the triathlon to the Games schedule. As of January 2013, host city and dates of the games were not yet confirmed.

The International Olympic Committee banned the Indian Committee in March for political interference (the national government played a role in Olympic officials' selection). This delayed the event further as the ban was only lifted in May and the possibility of a low-cost edition of the games was raised among ongoing hosting discussions and poor relations with neighboring Pakistan due to the 2013 India–Pakistan border incidents.

Two years later, on 11 February 2014, the International Olympic Committee decided to lift the ban. Up until now, the Indian side competed in Olympic events such as the Winter Olympic Games as independent participants.
