= Golf Premier League =

The Golf Premier League was a franchise-based golf tournament held in Aamby Valley, India in 2013. Each franchise consisted of four golfers: one international golfer, one Indian golfer, one from one Asian tour and one from golf tour of India. Players were purchased through auctions consisting of 32 international golfers. The league was played from 7 February to 10 February 2013 and also brought the practice of daytime and nighttime golf play.

Uttarakhand Lions, led by Ryder Cup player Darren Clarke, were the winners of the tournament.

== Franchises ==
The following eight teams took part.

- Colombo Sixes
- Delhi Darts
- Gujarat Underdawgs
- Maharashtra 59ers
- Punjab Lancers
- Uttar Pradesh Eagles
- Tamil Nadu Pullees
- Uttarakhand Lions
