= 2011 Kabaddi World Cup (circle style) =

International kabaddi tournament in India

- Logo of the 2011 Kabaddi World Cup

Tournament information
- Dates: 1 November–20 November
- Administrator: Government of Punjab, India; Recognised by International Kabaddi Federation
- Format: Circle Style
- Tournament format(s): Round-robin and Knockout
- Host(s): India
- Venue(s): 16 venues in 16 cities (List of Venues)
- Participants: 14 (List of Participants)

Final positions
- Champions: India (2nd title)
- 1st runners-up: Canada
- 2nd runners-up: Pakistan

Tournament statistics
- Matches played: 46
- Best Raider: (India) Gagandeep Singh Kheerawali
- Best Stopper: (India) Mangat Singh Mangi

Pearls Kabaddi World Cup 2011 was the second edition of the circle style Kabaddi World Cup played in Punjab, India and overall fourth Kabaddi World Cup. It was played in various cities of the province from 1 to 20 November 2011 with teams from 14 countries.

== Teams ==
A total of 14 teams took part in this tournament in matches between 1 and 20 November.

- Afghanistan
- Argentina
- Australia^{DQ}
- Canada
- Germany
- India
- Italy
- Nepal
- Norway
- Pakistan
- Spain
- Sri Lanka
- United Kingdom
- United States^{DQ}

^{DQ} Disqualified during the tournament for doping

== Pools ==
The teams were divided into two pools of seven teams each. Hosts India were placed in Pool A while their traditional rivals Pakistan were in Pool B.

Pool A	Pool B
Afghanistan; Australia; Canada; Germany; India; Nepal; United Kingdom	Argentina; Italy; Norway; Pakistan; Spain; United States

== Competition format ==
Fourteen teams competed in tournament consisting of two rounds. In the first round, teams were divided into two pools of seven teams each, and followed round-robin format with each of the team playing all other teams in the pool once. Following the completion of the league matches, teams placed first and second in each pool advanced to a single elimination round consisting of two semifinal games, a third place play-off and a final.

== Venues ==
The games were played at:

- Sports Stadium, Bathinda
- Nehru Stadium, Faridkot
- Government College Stadium, Gurdaspur
- Dhudike, Moga
- Nehru Stadium, Rupnagar
- War Heroes Stadium, Sangrur
- Chohla Sahib, Tarn Taran
- Yadvindra Public School Stadium, Patiala
- Guru Nanak Sports Stadium, Kapurthala
- Doda, Muktsar
- Guru Nanak Stadium, Amritsar
- Shaheed Bhagat Singh Stadium, Ferozepur
- Lajwanti Stadium, Hoshiarpur
- NM Govt. College, Mansa
- Guru Gobind Singh Stadium, Jalandhar
- Guru Nanak Stadium, Ludhiana

== Prize money ==
The teams vied for the title as well as the total prize money of ₹ 4.11 crore. According to Deputy Chief Minister of Punjab and tournament's chairman Sukhbir Singh Badal, the prize money of this edition of the event been doubled to ₹ 2 crore for the winning team. The runners-up earned ₹ 1 crore, while the team finishing in third place received ₹ 51 lakhs. In addition, the deputy Chief Minister said each participating team would get ₹ 10 lakhs. The best raider and stopper of the tournament were awarded with Preet Tractors.

== Opening ceremony ==
The event got off to an elaborate start on the evening of 1 November at Sports Stadium, Bathinda with performances by Bollywood actor Shah Rukh Khan, Sukhwinder Singh and other Punjabi artists, as well as a laser and fireworks show.

== Schedule ==
All matches' timings were according to Indian Standard Time (UTC +5:30).

=== Group stage ===
==== Pool A ====
Team	Pld	W	D	L	SF	SA	SD	Pts
India	6	6	0	0	362	125	237	12
Canada	6	5	0	1	301	180	121	10
United Kingdom	6	4	0	2	354	201	153	8
Germany	6	2	0	4	206	301	-95	4
Afghanistan	6	2	0	4	119	284	−165	4
Nepal	6	0	0	6	148	368	−220	0
Australia	6	2	0	4	222	215	7	4

Australia expelled from the tournament for doping

Qualified for semifinals

2 November 2011
14:00

Australia	68–23	Nepal

Nehru Stadium, Faridkot

2 November 2011
15:00

Canada	63–15	Afghanistan

Nehru Stadium, Faridkot

2 November 2011
16:30

India	70–18	Germany

Nehru Stadium, Faridkot

4 November 2011
14:00

India	67–21	Nepal

Sports Stadium, Dhudike, Moga

4 November 2011
15:00

United Kingdom	68–13	Afghanistan

Sports Stadium, Dhudike, Moga

4 November 2011
16:30

Canada	51–39	Australia

Sports Stadium, Dhudike, Moga

6 November 2011
14:00

Germany	58–23	Nepal

War Heroes Stadium, Sangrur

6 November 2011
15:00

India	66–23	Australia

War Heroes Stadium, Sangrur

6 November 2011
16:30

Canada	42–34	United Kingdom

War Heroes Stadium, Sangrur

8 November 2011
19:00

Afghanistan	48–41	Nepal

Yadvindra Sports Stadium, Patiala

8 November 2011
20:00

India	58–22	United Kingdom

Yadvindra Sports Stadium, Patiala

8 November 2011
21:30

Australia	60–29	Germany

Yadvindra Sports Stadium, Patiala

10 November 2011
14:00

Australia	32–45	United Kingdom

Sports Stadium, Doda, Muktsar

10 November 2011
15:00

Germany	62–26	Afghanistan

Sports Stadium, Doda, Muktsar

10 November 2011
16:30

India	51–24	Canada

Sports Stadium, Doda, Muktsar

12 November 2011
13:30

Canada	64–22	Nepal

Shaheed Bhagat Singh Stadium, Ferozepur

12 November 2011
14:30

Australia	0–1	Afghanistan

Shaheed Bhagat Singh Stadium, Ferozepur

- Australia Forfeits. Afghanistan won by walkover because of unavailability of required minimum of players for Australia.

12 November 2011
16:30

United Kingdom	65–19	Germany

Shaheed Bhagat Singh Stadium, Ferozepur

15 November 2011
14:35

United Kingdom	63–18	Nepal

NM Govt. College, Mansa

15 November 2011
15:35

India	50–17	Afghanistan

NM Govt. College, Mansa

15 November 2011
16:45

Canada	58–19	Germany

NM Govt. College, Mansa

==== Pool B ====
Team	Pld	W	D	L	SF	SA	SD	Pts
Pakistan	6	5	0	1	371	129	242	10
Italy	6	4	0	2	314	194	120	8
Norway	5	3	0	2	222	200	22	6
Spain	6	2	0	4	255	258	-3	4
Argentina	6	1	0	5	129	402	−273	2
Sri Lanka	6	0	0	6	134	407	−273	0
United States	5	5	0	0	300	138	162	10

United States opted out from the tournament

Qualified for semifinals

3 November 2011
19:00

Norway	49–35	Spain

Government College Stadium, Gurdaspur

3 November 2011
20:00

Italy	68–08	Argentina

Government College Stadium, Gurdaspur

3 November 2011
21:30

Pakistan	39–43	United States

Government College Stadium, Gurdaspur

5 November 2011
14:00

Argentina	25–62	Norway

Nehru Stadium, Rupnagar

5 November 2011
15:00

Pakistan	71–09	Sri Lanka

Nehru Stadium, Rupnagar

5 November 2011
16:30

United States	56–37	Italy

Nehru Stadium, Rupnagar

7 November 2011
14:00

Spain	70–26	Sri Lanka

Chohla Sahib, Tarn Taran

7 November 2011
15:00

United States	71–17	Argentina

Chohla Sahib, Tarn Taran

7 November 2011
16:30

Pakistan	50–37	Italy

Chohla Sahib, Tarn Taran

9 November 2011
14:00

Norway	63–24	Sri Lanka

Guru Nanak Sports Stadium, Kapurthala

9 November 2011
15:00

Pakistan	82–11	Argentina

Guru Nanak Sports Stadium, Kapurthala

9 November 2011
16:30

Italy	52–31	Spain

Guru Nanak Sports Stadium, Kapurthala

11 November 2011
19:00

Argentina	53–49	Sri Lanka

Guru Nanak Stadium, Amritsar

11 November 2011
20:00

Pakistan	67–15	Norway

Guru Nanak Stadium, Amritsar

11 November 2011
22:30

United States	54–35	Spain

Guru Nanak Stadium, Amritsar

14 November 2011
13:30

United States	76–10	Sri Lanka

Lajwanti Stadium, Hoshiarpur

14 November 2011
14:30

Argentina	15–70	Spain

Lajwanti Stadium, Hoshiarpur

14 November 2011
16:30

Italy	49–33	Norway

Lajwanti Stadium, Hoshiarpur

16 November 2011
19:05

Italy	74–16	Sri Lanka

Guru Gobind Singh Stadium, Jalandhar

16 November 2011

United States	Abandoned	Norway

Guru Gobind Singh Stadium, Jalandhar

- Match abandoned due to USA's expulsion from the tournament

16 November 2011
21:15

Pakistan	62–14	Spain

Guru Gobind Singh Stadium, Jalandhar

=== Knockout stage ===
Semi-finals
18 November – Sports Stadium, Bathinda
India	74
Italy	15
18 November – Sports Stadium, Bathinda
Pakistan	39
Canada	44

Final
20 November – Guru Nanak Stadium, Ludhiana
India	59
Canada	25
Third place
20 November – Guru Nanak Stadium, Ludhiana
Italy	22
Pakistan	60

==== Semi-finals ====
18 November 2011
19:15

India	74–15	Italy

Sports Stadium, Bathinda

18 November 2011
21:15

Pakistan	39–44	Canada

Sports Stadium, Bathinda

- Canada had lesser players(8) to play with and as a result 2 points were awarded to Pakistan before the start of match and the start of the 2nd half.

==== Third place ====
20 November 2011
17:15

Italy	22–60	Pakistan

Guru Nanak Stadium, Ludhiana

==== Final ====
20 November 2011
22:15

India	59–25	Canada

Guru Nanak Stadium, Ludhiana

- Canada had lesser players(8) to play with and as a result 2 points were awarded to India before the start of match and the beginning of the 2nd half.

2011 Kabaddi World Cup
1st Runners-up	Champions	2nd Runners-up
Canada	India; Fourth Title	Pakistan

== Closing ceremony ==
The closing ceremony of the Kabaddi World Cup was held at Guru Nanak Stadium in Ludhiana on 20 November.

On this occasion Pakistan's former prime minister Chaudhary Sujaat Hussain, former information and sports minister Chaudhary Nisar Hussain, Pakistan Punjab's former education minister Mian Imran Masood, acting ambassador of Germany Ford Millard, Indian Punjab's chief minister Parkash Singh Badal, deputy chief minister and state's sports minister, Sukhbir Singh Badal, Punjab cabinet minister Tikshan Sud along with his several cabinet colleagues, were also present.

The closing ceremony also included the appearances of Bollywood stars Akshay Kumar, Deepika Padukone and Chitrangda Singh and performances by RDB from Canada, Punjabi singers Harbhajan Mann and Satinder Satti. .

== Broadcasting rights ==
Television

Countries	Broadcaster
India	PTC Punjabi (Opening & Closing ceremonies); PTC News (Day matches and All night matches); PTC Chak De (Day matches 16:30)
Canada; United States	PTC Punjabi
Pakistan	GEO Super

== Doping ==
National Anti Doping Agency (NADA) was responsible for ensuring that second World Cup Kabaddi tournament is dope free. It was mandatory that in each match four players, two each from both playing teams go for dope test and the players were selected on the spot and he/she could be tested again.

On 12 November 2011, the number of players tested positive for drugs touched 25 from over 100 samples.

Teams from Australia (6), UK (5), US (4), Canada (4), Spain (4), Italy (3), Norway (2) Germany (1), Argentina (1), India (1) lost players on account of doping. Pakistan, Sri-Lanka, Afghanistan and Nepal remained dope-free. The tournament was plunged into a new controversy when four members of the US team refused to give samples to the National Anti-Doping Agency officials for dope tests at Hoshiarpur. Taking a serious note of the refusal by the players, the technical committee of World Cup kabaddi held a meeting and decided to impose ban on the US team for rest of the matches.

The US team players claimed that they believed it was a well thought-out plan to target their team in doping tests as the organisers were keen on an India-Pakistan final clash.
