= 2014 Kabaddi World Cup (circle style) =

International kabaddi tournament in India

Tournament information
- Dates: 7 December–20 December
- Administrator: Government of Punjab
- Format: Circle style
- Tournament format(s): Round-robin and Knockout
- Host: India
- Venue: 13
- Participants: 11

Final positions
- Champions: M: India (5th title); W: India (2nd title)
- 1st runners-up: M: Pakistan; W: New Zealand
- 2nd runners-up: M: Iran; W: Pakistan

Tournament statistics
- Matches played: 29
- Best Raider: (India) Sandeep Surkhpuria (Pakistan) Shafique Chishti
- Best Stopper: (India) Yadwinder Singh Surkhpuria

The 2014 World Kabaddi Cup was the fifth edition of the circle style World Kabaddi Cup, held from 7 December to 20 December 2014 with the opening ceremony on 6 December 2014 at the Guru Gobind Singh Stadium in Jalandhar. The tournament took place in Punjab, India.

== Organization ==
The tournament is organized by the Government of Punjab, India. The dates of the tournament were first announced publicly on 30 August 2014. The opening and closing ceremonies were telecast live throughout India, with international broadcasting in Canada, United States, United Kingdom and Australia.

== Participating nations ==
The 12-day-long event had 11 participating nations in the men's tournament, with 8 participating nations in the women's tournament.

=== Men's tournament ===
- Argentina
- Australia
- Canada
- Denmark
- England
- India
- Iran
- Pakistan
- Spain
- Sweden
- United States

=== Women's tournament ===
- Azerbaijan
- Denmark
- England
- India
- Mexico
- New Zealand
- Pakistan
- United States

== Venues ==
The games played at the following venues.

- Government College Stadium, Gurdaspur
- Multi Purpose Sports Stadium, Dhudike
- Nehru Stadium, Rupnagar
- A.S. College Stadium, Khanna, Ludhiana
- Guru Arjun Dev Sports Stadium, Chohla Sahib, Tarn Taran
- Guru Nanak Stadium, Ludhiana
- Lajwanti Stadium, Hoshiarpur
- Punjab Public School, Nabha
- Multipurpose Sports Stadium, Jalalabad, Fazilka
- Shaheed Captain Manjinder Singh Bhinder Stadium, Mehta Chowk Amritsar
- Shaheed Bachan Singh Kabaddi Stadium, Dirba
- Baba Kala Mehar Stadium, Barnala
- Guru Gobind Singh Multipurpose Stadium, Badal Sri Muktsar Sahib

== Opening ceremony ==
On 6 December, the opening ceremony was held in the Evening at Guru Gobind Singh Stadium in Jalandhar. Sharry Mann, Harshdeep Kaur, Sonakshi Sinha and Arjun Kapoor appeared at this mega event.

== Closing ceremony ==
On 20 December, the closing ceremony was held before the final match at Guru Gobind Singh Multipurpose Stadium, Badal Sri Muktsar Sahib. Miss Pooja and Gippy Grewal appeared to close the event.

== Schedule (Men’s) ==
Note: All matches' timings are according to Indian Standard Time (UTC +5:30) 14 December matches in Hoshiarpur, Punjab were cancelled due to heavy rain. 15 December matches in Nabha, Punjab were shifted from Government Ripudaman Stadium to Punjab Public School.

=== Group stage ===
==== Pool A ====
| Team | Pld | W | D | L | SF | SA | SD | Pts |
|---|---|---|---|---|---|---|---|---|
| India | 4 | 4 | 0 | 0 | 208 | 129 | 79 | 8 |
| Iran | 4 | 3 | 0 | 1 | 192 | 148 | 44 | 6 |
| United States | 4 | 2 | 0 | 2 | 154 | 158 | -4 | 4 |
| Australia | 4 | 1 | 0 | 3 | 128 | 189 | -61 | 2 |
| Spain | 4 | 0 | 0 | 4 | 125 | 183 | -58 | 0 |

Qualified for semifinals

8 December 2014
12:20

| Australia | 43 - 34 | Spain |

Multipurpose Stadium, Dhudike

8 December 2014
14:50

| Iran | 40 - 39 | United States |

Multipurpose Stadium, Dhudike

10 December 2014
13:35

| Australia | 29 - 59 | Iran |

A.S. College Stadium, Khanna, Ludhiana

10 December 2014
16:00

| India | 51 - 38 | Spain |

A.S. College Stadium, Khanna, Ludhiana

13 December 2014
12:15

| Spain | 27 - 54 | Iran |

Guru Nanak Stadium, Sultanpur Lodhi

13 December 2014
14:40

| India | 59 - 29 | United States |

Guru Nanak Stadium, Sultanpur Lodhi

15 December 2014
12:10

| United States | 51 - 33 | Australia |

Punjab Public School, Nabha

15 December 2014
15:45

| India | 53 - 39 | Iran |

Punjab Public School, Nabha

16 December 2014
10:55

| United States | 35 - 26 | Spain |

Multipurpose Sports Stadium, Jalalabad, Fazilka

16 December 2014
12:45

| India | 45 - 23 | Australia |

Multipurpose Sports Stadium, Jalalabad, Fazilka

==== Pool B ====
| Team | Pld | W | D | L | SF | SA | SD | Pts |
|---|---|---|---|---|---|---|---|---|
| Pakistan | 5 | 5 | 0 | 0 | 267 | 131 | 136 | 10 |
| England | 5 | 4 | 0 | 1 | 229 | 169 | 60 | 8 |
| Canada | 5 | 3 | 0 | 2 | 219 | 136 | 83 | 6 |
| Denmark | 5 | 2 | 0 | 3 | 157 | 237 | -80 | 4 |
| Sweden | 5 | 1 | 0 | 4 | 163 | 218 | -55 | 2 |
| Argentina | 5 | 0 | 0 | 5 | 129 | 273 | -144 | 0 |

Qualified for semifinals

7 December 2014
18:10

| Sweden | 32 - 51 | England |

Government College Stadium, Gurdaspur

7 December 2014
20:20

| Argentina | 35 - 53 | Denmark |

Government College Stadium, Gurdaspur

9 December 2014
12:10

| Argentina | 30 - 52 | Sweden |

Nehru Stadium, Rupnagar

9 December 2014
14:40

| Pakistan | 69 - 24 | Denmark |

Nehru Stadium, Rupnagar

9 December 2014
15:55

| Canada | 36 - 39 | England |

Nehru Stadium, Rupnagar

11 December 2014
12:25

| Denmark | 45 - 42 | Sweden |

Guru Arjun Dev Sports Stadium, Chohla Sahib, Tarn Taran

11 December 2014
13:35

| Canada | 59 - 22 | Argentina |

Guru Arjun Dev Sports Stadium, Chohla Sahib, Tarn Taran

11 December 2014
16:20

| Pakistan | 58 - 31 | England |

Guru Arjun Dev Sports Stadium, Chohla Sahib, Tarn Taran

15 December 2014
13:25

| Pakistan | 45 - 35 | Canada |

Punjab Public School, Nabha

15 December 2014
14:40

| England | 64 - 22 | Argentina |

Punjab Public School, Nabha

16 December 2014
14:40

| Denmark | 14 - 47 | Canada |

Multipurpose Sports Stadium, Jalalabad, Fazilka

16 December 2014
15:40

| Pakistan | 50 - 21 | Sweden |

Multipurpose Sports Stadium, Jalalabad, Fazilka

17 December 2014
11:35

| England | 44 - 21 | Denmark |

Shaheed Captain Manjinder Singh Bhinder Stadium, Mehta Chowk Amritsar

17 December 2014
14:35

| Sweden | 16 - 42 | Canada |

Shaheed Captain Manjinder Singh Bhinder Stadium, Mehta Chowk Amritsar

17 December 2014
15:35

| Pakistan | 45 - 20 | Argentina |

Shaheed Captain Manjinder Singh Bhinder Stadium, Mehta Chowk Amritsar

=== Knockout stage ===
Semi-finals
18 December – Shaheed Bachan Singh Kabaddi Stadium, Dirba
India | 54
England | 33
18 December – Shaheed Bachan Singh Kabaddi Stadium, Dirba
Pakistan | 56
Iran | 28

Final
20 December – Guru Gobind Singh Multipurpose Stadium, Badal Sri Muktsar Sahib
India | 45
Pakistan | 42
Third place
19 December – Baba Kala Mehar Stadium, Barnala
Iran | 48
England | 31

==== Semi-finals ====
18 December 2014
13:25

| Pakistan | 56 - 28 | Iran |

Shaheed Bachan Singh Kabaddi Stadium, Dirba

18 December 2014
15:35

| India | 54 - 33 | England |

Shaheed Bachan Singh Kabaddi Stadium, Dirba

==== Third place ====
19 December 2014
14:15

| Iran | 48 - 31 | England |

Baba Kala Mehar Stadium, Barnala

=== Final match ===
20 December 2014
17:55

| India | 45 - 42 | Pakistan |

Guru Gobind Singh Multipurpose Stadium, Badal Sri Muktsar Sahib

== Schedule (Women’s) ==
Note: All matches' timings are according to Indian Standard Time (UTC +5:30).

=== Group stage ===
==== Pool A ====
| Team | Pld | W | D | L | SF | SA | SD | Pts |
|---|---|---|---|---|---|---|---|---|
| India | 3 | 3 | 0 | 0 | 153 | 47 | 106 | 6 |
| Denmark | 3 | 2 | 0 | 1 | 100 | 99 | 1 | 4 |
| Azerbaijan | 3 | 1 | 0 | 2 | 71 | 119 | -48 | 2 |
| United States | 3 | 0 | 0 | 3 | 79 | 138 | -59 | 0 |

Qualified for semifinals

8 December 2014
13:35

| India | 56 - 15 | United States |

Multipurpose Stadium, Dhudike

10 December 2014
12:30

| Azerbaijan | 17 - 40 | Denmark |

A.S. College Stadium, Khanna, Ludhiana

13 December 2014
13:30

| India | 50 - 16 | Denmark |

Guru Nanak Stadium, Sultanpur Lodhi

15 December 2014
11:05

| Azerbaijan | 38 - 32 | United States |

Punjab Public School, Nabha

16 December 2014
11:50

| India | 47 - 16 | Azerbaijan |

Multipurpose Sports Stadium, Jalalabad, Fazilka

17 December 2014
12:30

| Denmark | 44 - 32 | United States |

Shaheed Captain Manjinder Singh Bhinder Stadium, Mehta Chowk Amritsar

==== Pool B ====
| Team | Pld | W | D | L | SF | SA | SD | Pts |
|---|---|---|---|---|---|---|---|---|
| New Zealand | 3 | 3 | 0 | 0 | 134 | 74 | 60 | 6 |
| Pakistan | 3 | 2 | 0 | 1 | 114 | 95 | 19 | 4 |
| England | 3 | 1 | 0 | 2 | 96 | 111 | -15 | 2 |
| Mexico | 3 | 0 | 0 | 3 | 70 | 134 | -64 | 0 |

Qualified for semifinals

7 December 2014
19:20

| New Zealand | 45 - 21 | England |

Government College Stadium, Gurdaspur

9 December 2014
13:25

| Mexico | 20 - 45 | Pakistan |

Nehru Stadium, Rupnagar

10 December 2014
14:55

| Pakistan | 39 - 37 | England |

A.S. College Stadium, Khanna, Ludhiana

11 December 2014
14:45

| New Zealand | 38 - 30 | Pakistan |

Guru Arjun Dev Sports Stadium, Chohla Sahib, Tarn Taran

16 December 2014
13:45

| New Zealand | 51 - 23 | Mexico |

Multipurpose Sports Stadium, Jalalabad, Fazilka

17 December 2014
13:30

| England | 38 - 27 | Mexico |

Shaheed Captain Manjinder Singh Bhinder Stadium, Mehta Chowk Amritsar

=== Knockout stage ===
Semi-finals
18 December – Shaheed Bachan Singh Kabaddi Stadium, Dirba
India | 47
Pakistan | 19
18 December – Shaheed Bachan Singh Kabaddi Stadium, Dirba
New Zealand | 41
Denmark | 20

Final
20 December – Guru Gobind Singh Multipurpose Stadium, Badal Sri Muktsar Sahib
India | 36
New Zealand | 27
Third place
19 December – Baba Kala Mehar Stadium, Barnala
Pakistan | 38
Denmark | 28

==== Semi-finals ====
18 December 2014
12:05

| New Zealand | 41 - 20 | Denmark |

Shaheed Bachan Singh Kabaddi Stadium, Dirba

18 December 2014
14:40

| India | 47 - 19 | Pakistan |

Shaheed Bachan Singh Kabaddi Stadium, Dirba

==== Third place ====
19 December 2014
12:05

| Pakistan | 38 - 28 | Denmark |

Baba Kala Mehar Stadium, Barnala

==== Final match ====
20 December 2014
16:35

| India | 36 - 27 | New Zealand |

Guru Gobind Singh Multipurpose Stadium, Badal Sri Muktsar Sahib

== Broadcasting ==
Television

| Countries | Broadcaster |
|---|---|
| India | PTC News |
| Canada; United States; United Kingdom; European Union; Australia; New Zealand | PTC Punjabi |
