= 2012 Kabaddi World Cup (circle style) =

International kabaddi tournament in India

2012 Kabaddi World Cup (Men)

Tournament information
- Dates: 1 December–15 December
- Administrator: Government of Punjab
- Format: Circle style
- Tournament format(s): Round-robin and Knockout
- Host(s): India
- Venue(s): 13
- Participants: 16

Final positions
- Champions: India (3rd title)
- 1st runners-up: Pakistan
- 2nd runners-up: Canada

Tournament statistics
- Matches played: 46
- Best Raider: (India) Gagandeep Singh Kheerawali
- Best Stopper: (India) Ekam hathoor

2012 Kabaddi World Cup was the third edition of the circle style Kabaddi World Cup, organised by the Government of Punjab. It was played in Punjab, India in various cities of the province from 1 to 15 December 2012 with teams from 16 countries. The opening ceremony of the tournament was held in Bathinda and the closing ceremony in Ludhiana.

The prize money for the winners of the third edition was doubled to ₹ 2 crore, while the runners-up received ₹ 1 crore. The team finishing at third position received ₹ 51 lakhs.

The Deputy Chief Minister Sukhbir Singh Badal said that dope testing would be mandatory for each player.

Ekamjeet was declared the best stopper and Gagandeep Gaggi was chosen as the best raider of the tournament.

== Participating nations ==
The 15-day-long tournament had sixteen participating nations:

- Afghanistan
- Argentina
- Canada
- Denmark
- England
- India
- Iran
- Italy
- Kenya
- New Zealand
- Norway
- Pakistan
- Scotland
- Sierra Leone
- Sri Lanka
- United States

== Pools ==
The 16 teams were divided into four pools of four teams each. Hosts India were placed in Pool A.

Pool A	Pool B	Pool C	Pool D
Afghanistan; Denmark; England; India	Canada; New Zealand; Norway; Sri Lanka	Italy; Pakistan; Scotland; Sierra Leone	Argentina; Iran; Kenya; United States

== Venues ==
The games was played at the following venues.

- Yadvindra Public School Stadium, Patiala
- Lajwanti Stadium, Hoshiarpur
- Guru Nanak Stadium, Amritsar
- Sports Stadium, Doda, Sri Muktsar Sahib
- War Heroes Stadium, Sangrur
- Nehru Stadium, Rupnagar
- Sports Stadium, Chohla Sahib, Tarn Taran
- Government College Stadium, mansa
- N.M. Government College Stadium, Mansa
- Sports Stadium, Bathinda
- Guru Gobind Singh Stadium, Jalandhar
- Guru Nanak Stadium, Ludhiana
- M.R. Government College Stadium, Fazilka

== Schedule ==
Note: All matches' timings are according to Indian Standard Time (UTC +5:30).

=== Group stage ===
==== Pool A ====
Team	Pld	W	D	L	SF	SA	SD	Pts
India	3	3	0	0	203	80	123	6
England	3	2	0	1	105	103	2	4
Denmark	3	1	0	2	108	119	-11	2
Afghanistan	3	0	0	3	78	192	-114	0

Qualified for semifinals

2 December 2012
18:30

England	58 – 25	Denmark

Yadvindra Public School Stadium, Patiala

5 December 2012
13:00

Afghanistan	33 – 55	Denmark

Sports Stadium, Doda Muktsar

5 December 2012
16:30

India	57 – 28	England

Sports Stadium, Doda, Muktsar

6 December 2012
16:30

India	73 – 24	Afghanistan

War Heroes Stadium, Sangrur

11 December 2012
13:00

England	64 – 21	Afghanistan

N.M. Government College Stadium, Mansa

11 December 2012
15:00

India	73 – 28	Denmark

N.M. Government College Stadium, Mansa

==== Pool B ====
Team	Pld	W	D	L	SF	SA	SD	Pts
Canada	2	2	0	0	108	67	41	4
Norway	2	1	0	1	88	81	7	2
Sri Lanka	0	0	0	0	0	0	0	0
New Zealand	2	0	0	2	66	114	-58	0

Qualified for semifinals

2 December 2012
19:30

New Zealand	35 – 52	Norway

Yadvindra Public School Stadium, Patiala

2 December 2012
21:00

Canada	Cancelled	Sri Lanka

Yadvindra Public School Stadium, Patiala

6 December 2012
12:30

Canada	62 – 31	New Zealand

War Heroes Stadium, Sangrur

9 December 2012
12:30

Canada	46 – 36	Norway

M.R. Government College Stadium Fazilka

9 December 2012
13:30

New Zealand	Cancelled	Sri Lanka

M.R. Government College Stadium, Fazilka

11 December 2012
13:30

Norway	Cancelled	Sri Lanka

N.M. Government College Stadium, Mansa

==== Pool C ====
Team	Pld	W	D	L	SF	SA	SD	Pts
Pakistan	3	3	0	0	173	53	120	6
Italy	3	2	0	1	142	114	28	4
Sierra Leone	3	1	0	2	120	132	-12	2
Scotland	3	0	0	3	64	200	-136	0

Qualified for semifinals

3 December 2012
14:00

Scotland	19 – 66	Italy

Lajwanti Stadium, Hoshiarpur

3 December 2012
16:30

Pakistan	52 – 12	Sierra Leone

Lajwanti Stadium, Hoshiarpur

4 December 2012
20:30

Pakistan	61 – 21	Scotland

Guru Nanak Stadium, Amritsar

8 December 2012
13:00

Sierra Leone	73 – 24	Scotland

Sports Stadium, Chohla Sahib, Tarn Taran

8 December 2012
14:00

Pakistan	60 – 20	Italy

Sports Stadium, Chohla Sahib, Tarn Taran

10 December 2012
18:30

Sierra Leone	56 – 35	Italy

Government College Stadium, Gurdaspur

==== Pool D ====
Team	Pld	W	D	L	SF	SA	SD	Pts
Iran	3	3	0	0	194	74	120	6
United States	3	2	0	1	193	75	118	4
Argentina	3	1	0	2	87	190	-103	2
Kenya	3	0	0	3	74	209	-135	0

Qualified for semifinals

3 December 2011
13:00

Argentina	18 – 70	Iran

Lajwanti Stadium, Hoshiarpur

4 December 2012
18:30

Argentina	14 – 77	United States

Guru Nanak Stadium, Amritsar

4 December 2012
19:30

Iran	79 – 15	Kenya

Guru Nanak Stadium, Amritsar

7 December 2012
13:00

Argentina	55 – 43	Kenya

Nehru Stadium, Rupnagar

7 December 2012
14:00

Iran	45 – 41	United States

Nehru Stadium, Rupnagar

10 December 2012
20:30

Kenya	16 – 75	United States

Government College Stadium, Gurdaspur

=== Knockout stage ===
Semi-finals
12 December – Sports Stadium, Bathinda
India	71
Iran	23
12 December – Sports Stadium, Bathinda
Canada	27
Pakistan	53

Final
15 December – Guru Nanak Stadium, Ludhiana
India	59
Pakistan	22
Third place
13 December – Guru Gobind Singh Stadium, Jalandhar
Iran	35
Canada	51

==== Semi-finals ====
12 December 2012
19:15

India	71 -23	Iran

Sports Stadium, Bathinda

12 December 2012
21:15

Canada	27 - 53	Pakistan

Sports Stadium, Bathinda

==== Third place ====
13 December 2012
19:00

Iran	35 – 51	Canada

Guru Gobind Singh Stadium, Jalandhar

==== Final ====
15 December 2012
21:00

India	59 – 25	Pakistan

Guru Nanak Stadium, Ludhiana

2012 Kabaddi World Cup
1st Runners-up	Champions	2nd Runners-up
Pakistan	India; Fifth Title	Canada
