= 2013 Kabaddi World Cup (circle style) =

International kabaddi tournament in India

Tournament information
- Dates: 1 December–14 December
- Administrator: Government of Punjab
- Format: Circle style
- Tournament format(s): Round-robin and Knockout
- Host(s): India
- Venue(s): 13
- Participants: 11
- Website: www.watchkabaddi.com

Final positions
- Champions: M: India (4th title); W: India (1st title)
- 1st runners-up: M: Pakistan; W: New Zealand
- 2nd runners-up: M: United States; W: Denmark

Tournament statistics
- Best Raider: (India) Balvir Singh Dulla
- Best Stopper: (India) Balbir Singh Pala

The 2013 World Kabaddi Cup was the fourth edition of the circle style World Kabaddi Cup, held from 1 to 14 December 2013 with the Opening Ceremony on 30 November 2013 at Bathinda. The tournament took place in Punjab, India.

== Organization ==
The tournament was organized by the Government of Punjab, India. The dates of the tournament were first announced publicly on 12 July 2013. Approving of the 20 crore budget for the 4th World Cup Kabaddi, the opening and closing ceremonies were telecast live throughout the country, with international broadcasting in Canada, the United States, India and the United Kingdom.

== Participating nations ==
The 14-day-long event had 11 participating nations in the men's tournament, with 8 participating nations in the women's tournament.

=== Men's tournament ===
- Argentina
- Canada
- England
- India
- Iran^{DNP}
- Kenya
- Pakistan
- Scotland
- Sierra Leone
- Spain
- United States
- Denmark

^{DNP} Did not play.

=== Women's tournament ===
- Denmark
- England
- India
- Kenya
- Mexico
- New Zealand
- Pakistan
- United States

== Venues ==
The games played at the following venues.

- Guru Nanak Stadium, Amritsar
- Multi-Purpose Sports Stadium, Bathinda
- Sports Stadium, Jalalabad, Fazilka
- Government College Stadium, Gurdaspur
- Lajwanti Stadium, Hoshiarpur
- Guru Gobind Singh Stadium, Jalandhar
- Guru Nanak Stadium, Ludhiana
- N.M. Government College Stadium, Mansa
- Yadvindra Public School Stadium, Patiala
- Nehru Stadium, Rupnagar
- War Heroes Stadium, Sangrur
- Sen. Sec. School Stadium, Doda, Sri Muktsar Sahib
- Guru Arjun Dev Sports Stadium, Chohla Sahib, Tarn Taran

== Opening ceremony ==
Opening Ceremony was held at Bathinda. Many Celebrities Of Cinema of Punjab and Bollywood Performed at this mega event. Those who performed were actress Priyanka Chopra, Gippy Grewal, Sharry Mann and Miss Pooja.

== Closing ceremony ==
Closing Ceremony was held at Ludhiana. Chief Minister of Punjab, Pakistan Mian Shahbaz Sharif was the chief guest for the ceremony. Many Indian and Pakistani Celebrities Of Cinema of Punjab and Bollywood performed at this mega event like actor Ranveer Singh, Fariha Pervez, Bir Khalsa Gatka Group, Master Saleem, Prince Dance Group, Lakhwinder Wadali, Roshan Prince, Jaspinder Narula. There was interruption in Jaspinder Narula's Performance by young supporter of Bhai Gurbaksh Singh Khalsa who is on Hunger strike for release of Sikh Prisoners who have completed their full terms in jail and not even released yet.

== Schedule (Men’s) ==
Note: All matches' timings are according to Indian Standard Time (UTC +5:30).

=== Group stage ===
==== Pool A ====
Team	Pld	W	D	L	SF	SA	SD	Pts
India	4	4	0	0	233	122	111	8
United States	4	3	0	1	209	137	72	6
Spain	4	2	0	2	140	162	-22	4
Kenya	4	1	0	3	132	214	-82	2
Argentina	4	0	0	4	132	211	-79	0
Iran	0	0	0	0	0	0	0	0

Qualified for semifinals

1 December 2013
17:45

Kenya	32 - 40	Spain

Yadvindra Public School Stadium, Patiala

1 December 2013
20:10

India	59 - 31	United States

Yadvindra Public School Stadium, Patiala

3 December 2013
12:45

Kenya	13 - 68	United States

Lajwanti Stadium, Hoshiarpur

3 December 2013
15:10

India	55 - 27	Spain

Lajwanti Stadium, Hoshiarpur

5 December 2013
12:25

Argentina	24 - 47	Spain

Sen. Sec. School Stadium, Doda, Sri Muktsar Sahib

5 December 2013
16:00

India	69 - 32	Kenya

Sen. Sec. School Stadium, Doda, Sri Muktsar Sahib

6 December 2013
17:15

Argentina	37 - 55	Kenya

Guru Nanak Stadium, Amritsar

7 December 2013
12:15

Spain	26 - 51	United States

Sports Stadium, Jalalabad, Fazilka

7 December 2013
15:45

India	50 - 32	Argentina

Sports Stadium, Jalalabad, Fazilka

10 December 2013
13:35

Argentina	39 - 59	United States

N.M. Government College Stadium, Mansa

==== Pool B ====
Team	Pld	W	D	L	SF	SA	SD	Pts
Pakistan	5	5	0	0	340	118	222	10
England	5	4	0	1	238	196	42	8
Canada	5	3	0	2	284	169	115	6
Sierra Leone	5	2	0	3	205	222	-17	4
Denmark	5	1	0	4	143	336	-193	2
Scotland	5	0	0	5	146	315	-169	0

Qualified for semifinals

2 December 2013
12:45

England	41 - 33	Sierra Leone

Guru Arjun Dev Sports Stadium, Chohla Sahib, Tarn Taran

2 December 2013
14:20

Canada	89 - 9	Denmark

Guru Arjun Dev Sports Stadium, Chohla Sahib, Tarn Taran

2 December 2013
16:30

Pakistan	63 - 26	Scotland

Guru Arjun Dev Sports Stadium, Chohla Sahib, Tarn Taran

4 December 2013
19:28

Scotland	25 - 58	Sierra Leone

Government College Stadium, Gurdaspur

4 December 2013
21:50

Denmark	22 - 77	Pakistan

Government College Stadium, Gurdaspur

5 December 2013
13:40

Denmark	28 - 59	England

Sen. Sec School Stadium, Doda, Sri Muktsar Sahib

6 December 2013
18:30

Canada	72 - 21	Scotland

Guru Nanak Stadium, Amritsar

6 December 2013
20:49

Pakistan	70 - 13	Sierra Leone

Guru Nanak Stadium, Amritsar

8 December 2013
12:08

Denmark	28 - 67	Sierra Leone

Nehru Stadium, Rupnagar

8 December 2013
13:19

England	66 - 30	Scotland

Nehru Stadium, Rupnagar

8 December 2013
15:43

Canada	29 - 61	Pakistan

Nehru Stadium, Rupnagar

9 December 2013
12:20

Sierra Leone	34 - 58	Canada

War Heroes Stadium, Sangrur

9 December 2013
15:40

Pakistan	69 - 28	England

War Heroes Stadium, Sangrur

10 December 2013
12:15

Denmark	56 - 44	Scotland

N.M. Government College Stadium, Mansa

10 December 2013
16:30

Canada	36 - 44	England

N.M. Government College Stadium, Mansa

=== Knockout stage ===
Semi-finals
11 December – Multi Purpose Sports Stadium, Bathinda
India	62
England	32
11 December – Multi Purpose Sports Stadium, Bathinda
Pakistan	51
United States	33

Final
14 December – Guru Nanak Stadium, Ludhiana
India	48
Pakistan	39
Third place
12 December – Guru Gobind Singh Stadium Jalandhar
England	27
United States	62

==== Semi-finals ====
11 December 2013
19:44

Pakistan	51 - 33	United States

Multi Purpose Sports Stadium, Bathinda

11 December 2013
21:14

India	62 - 32	England

Multi Purpose Sports Stadium, Bathinda

==== Third place ====
12 December 2013
18:30

England	27 - 62	United States

Guru Gobind Singh Stadium, Jalandhar

=== Final match ===
14 December 2013
22:10

India	48 - 39	Pakistan

Guru Nanak Stadium, Ludhiana

== Schedule (Women’s) ==
Note: All matches' timings are according to Indian Standard Time (UTC +5:30).

=== Group stage ===
==== Pool A ====
Team	Pld	W	D	L	SF	SA	SD	Pts
India	3	3	0	0	159	48	111	6
New Zealand	3	2	0	1	116	88	28	4
United States	3	1	0	2	90	146	-56	2
Kenya	3	0	0	3	76	159	-83	0

Qualified for semifinals

1 December 2013
19:00

India	44 - 12	New Zealand

Yadvindra Public School Stadium, Patiala

3 December 2013
13:58

India	56 - 21	Kenya

Lajwanti Stadium, Hoshiarpur

5 December 2013
14:50

Kenya	21 - 51	New Zealand

Sen. Sec. School Stadium, Doda, Sri Muktsar Sahib

7 December 2013
13:20

India	59 - 15	United States

Sports Stadium, Jalalabad, Fazilka

8 December 2013
14:30

Kenya	34 - 52	United States

Nehru Stadium, Rupnagar

9 December 2013
14:35

New Zealand	53 - 23	United States

War Heroes Stadium, Sangrur

==== Pool B ====
Team	Pld	W	D	L	SF	SA	SD	Pts
Denmark	3	3	0	0	120	94	26	6
Pakistan	3	2	0	1	129	99	30	4
England	3	1	0	2	105	103	2	2
Mexico	3	0	0	3	78	136	-58	0

Qualified for semifinals

2 December 2013
15:25

Denmark	45 - 39	Pakistan

Guru Arjun Dev Sports Stadium, Chohla Sahib, Tarn Taran

4 December 2013
20:45

England	45 - 29	Mexico

Government College Stadium, Gurdaspur

6 December 2013
19:45

Denmark	42 - 25	Mexico

Guru Nanak Stadium, Amritsar

7 December 2013
14:20

England	30 - 41	Pakistan

Sports Stadium, Jalalabad, Fazilka

9 December 2013
13:30

Denmark	33 - 30	England

War Heroes Stadium, Sangrur

10 December 2013
15:10

Mexico	24 - 49	Pakistan

N.M. Government College Stadium, Mansa

=== Knockout stage ===
Semi-finals
11 December – Multi Purpose Sports Stadium, Bathinda
India	46
Pakistan	16
11 December – Multi Purpose Sports Stadium, Bathinda
Denmark	25
New Zealand	45

Final
12 December – Guru Gobind Singh Stadium Jalandhar
India	49
New Zealand	21
Third place
12 December – Guru Gobind Singh Stadium Jalandhar
Denmark	34
Pakistan	33

==== Semi-finals ====
11 December 2013
17:15

Denmark	25 - 45	New Zealand

Multi Purpose Sports Stadium, Bathinda

11 December 2013
18:38

India	46 - 16	Pakistan

Multi Purpose Sports Stadium, Bathinda

==== Third place ====
12 December 2013
17:20

Denmark	34 - 33	Pakistan

Guru Gobind Singh Stadium, Jalandhar

==== Final match ====
12 December 2013
20:00

India	49 - 21	New Zealand

Guru Gobind Singh Stadium, Jalandhar

== Doping ==
Issuing strict instructions for ensuring dope free tournament, he said that every participant player would have to undergo dope test as prescribed by NADA and sanctioned Rs 100 crore budget for it.

== Song ==
On 14 November 2013, prominent actor/director Harpreet Sandhu (Actor) release a song based on Kabaddi world cup called 2013 World Cup sung by Dilbag Brar and produced by ArtGauge Films Inc.

== Broadcasting ==
Television

Countries	Broadcaster
India	PTC Punjabi (Opening & Closing ceremonies); PTC News
Canada; United States; United Kingdom; European Union; Australia; New Zealand	PTC Punjabi
