= Mohit Chhillar =

Indian kabaddi player

Mohit Chillar
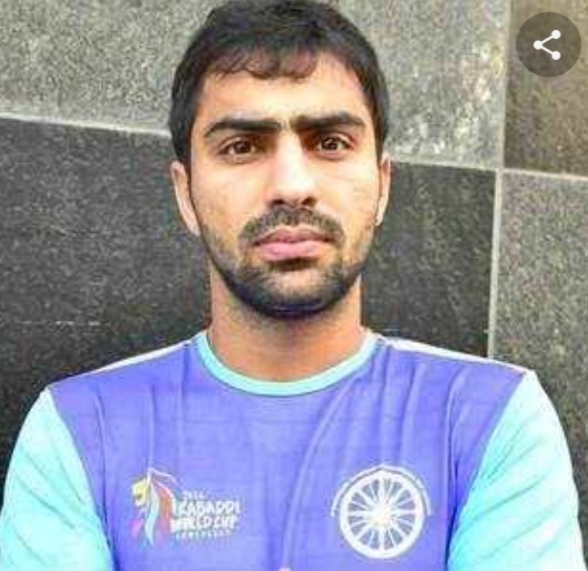

Personal information
- Nationality: Indian
- Born: 13 July 1993 (age 32)

Sport
- Country: India
- Sport: Kabaddi
- League: Pro Kabaddi League
- Club: Tamil Thalaivas
- Team: India national kabaddi team
Medal record
Asian Kabaddi Championship
Gold medal – first place	2017 Gorgan	Team
2018 Dubai Kabaddi Masters
Gold medal – first place	2018 Dubai	Team
2018 Asian Games
Bronze medal – third place	2018 Jakarta	Team

Mohit Chhillar (born 13 July 1993) is an Indian kabaddi player who currently plays for Tamil Thalaivas in the VIVO Pro Kabaddi League. He hails from Nizampur, Delhi and has been one of India's best defenders for the past decade. He is a versatile defender who can complement other corner defenders and form successful partnerships. Known for his overpowering holds and swift dashes, Mohit is fifth in the league's all-time High 5s (17) chart and fourth in the Tackle Points (240) and Super Tackles (20) leaderboards.

== Early life ==
Mohit started playing Kabaddi as a kid and played for the School Games Federation of India. Even though his father is a former Kabaddi player, it was his uncle who introduced him to the game. Since there were no training facilities in his hometown, Mohit was dependent on guidance from his seniors. After playing for his village club, then in the Juniors and finally the Pro Kabaddi League; Mohit cemented his position in the national team. He also works with the North West Railway at Jodhpur and is a big fan of actors Akshay Kumar and Salman Khan. His Kabaddi idols are Rakesh Kumar and Manjeet Chhillar, while Sachin Tendulkar is sporting idol away from his first sport. Despite his love for travelling, food cooked by his mother is Mohit's favourite and he's known to look forward to coming back home after long tournaments to enjoy a home-cooked meal.

== Kabaddi career ==
=== Season 1 ===
Mohit made his mark in the league in the inaugural season itself as one of the best defenders on show. He scored 35 tackle points for Bengaluru Bulls at a tackle strike rate of 39.32%. Mohit successful executed five Super Tackles and two High 5s as Mumbai finished runners-up despite dominating for most of the season.

=== Season 2 ===
The following season, by Mohit helped U Mumba win the prestigious title. He was one of the best defenders of the campaign and finished with 42 tackle points, three Super Tackles and three High 5s. His partnership in defence with Surender Nada was instrumental in U Mumba's title triumph.

=== Season 3 ===
U Mumba couldn't successfully defend their league title in the third season, but Mohit's consistent performances saw him score 46 tackle points with a tackle strike rate of 62.16%. He also registered six High 5s – the most he's ever managed for a single season.

=== Season 4 ===
Mohit was bought by Bengaluru Bulls for Rs. 53 lakhs ahead of the fourth season. The versatile defender didn't disappoint his new employers and finished the campaign with 47 tackle points. He had a tackle strike rate of 54.02%, made three Super Tackles and recorded four High 5s.

=== Season 5 ===
He represented Haryana Steelers in the fifth season and was once again one of his team's best performing defenders. Mohit scored 39 tackle points and even contributed 3 raid points in attack.

=== Season 6 ===
After just a season with Haryana Steelers, Mohit joined Jaipur Pink Panthers. However, he appeared in just 14 matches for Jaipur and finished the season with 31 tackle points. Mohit had a tackle strike rate of 44.92% and pulled off three Super Tackles over the course of the campaign.

=== Season 7 ===
In Season 7, he played for Tamil Thalaivas. He scored 37 tackle points.

International

Mohit's career with the national team started with him winning gold at the 2016 South Asian Games. He won the Kabaddi World Cup that same year and then gold at the 2017 Asian Kabaddi Championship. Other medals won by Mohit with India includes gold from the 2018 Dubai Kabaddi Masters and bronze from the 2018 Asian Games.

== Records and achievements ==
- Gold at 2016 South Asian Games
- Gold at 2016 Kabaddi World Cup
- Gold at 2017 Asian Kabaddi Championship
- Gold at the 2018 Dubai Kabaddi Masters
- Bronze at the 2018 Asian Games
