= Ahmadreza Asgari =

Iranian kabaddi player

Personal information
- Nationality: Iranian
- Born: 18 March 2001 (age 25)
- Height: 186 cm (6 ft 1 in)
- Weight: 85 kg (187 lb)

Sport
- Country: Iran
- Sport: Kabaddi
- Position: All-Rounder
- League: Pro Kabaddi League
- Club: Bengaluru Bulls
- Team: Iran national kabaddi team
Medal record
Representing Iran
Men's Kabaddi
Asian Championship
Silver medal – second place	2023 Busan	team

Ahmadreza Asgari (born 18 March 2001) is an Iranian professional kabaddi player who represents Iran in international matches. He also currently plays for Bengaluru Bulls in the Indian Pro Kabaddi League. He was part of the Iranian team that claimed gold in the men's team event at the 2019 Junior World Kabaddi Championship.

== See also ==
- Bengaluru Bulls
