= Ajay Thakur =

Indian kabaddi player (born 1987)

Personal information
- Full name: Ajay Thakur
- Nicknames: Ice Man, King of Kabaddi
- Nationality: Indian
- Citizenship: Indian
- Born: 1 May 1987 (age 39) Dabhota, Nalagarh, Himachal Pradesh, India
- Education: Government Post Graduation College, Nalagarh
- Occupations: DSP, Kabaddi Player
- Years active: 2007-present
- Height: 186 cm (6 ft 1 in)
- Weight: 76 kg (168 lb)
- Spouse: Sandeep Rana
- Police career
- Allegiance: India
- Department: Police Department
- Branch: Himachal Pradesh Police
- Service years: 2017-present
- Rank: DSP
- Awards: Padma Shri; Arjuna Award

Sport
- Country: India
- Sport: Kabaddi
- Position: Raider
- Kabaddi: Pro Kabaddi League
- Club: Bengaluru Bulls (2014-2015) Puneri Paltan (2016-2017); Tamil Thalaivas (2017-2020) Dabang Delhi (2021-2022)
- Team: India national kabaddi team, Himachal Pradesh
- Coached by: Baskaran Kasinathan, Balwan Singh
Medal record
Representing India
Asian Games
Gold medal – first place	2014 Incheon	Team
Bronze medal – third place	2018 Jakarta	Team
2016 Kabaddi World Cup
Gold medal – first place	2016 Ahmadabad	Team
Asian Kabaddi Championship
Gold medal – first place	2017 Gorgan	Team
2018 Dubai Kabaddi Masters
Gold medal – first place	2018 Dubai	Team
Asian Indoor Games
Gold medal – first place	2007 Incheon	Team
Asian Indoor and Martial Arts Games
Gold medal – first place	2013 Incheon	Team

Ajay Thakur (born 1 May 1987) is an Indian former professional kabaddi player and the former captain of the India national kabaddi team. He currently serves as the coach of Puneri Paltan in the Pro Kabaddi League.He is widely regarded as one of the greatest players of all time. He was part of the national teams which won 2016 Kabaddi World Cup and gold medal at 2014 Asian Games. He was awarded the Padma Shri and Arjuna Award in 2019.

He is a member of Himachal Pradesh Police Service cadre where he currently serves as a Deputy superintendent of police.

== Early life ==
Thakur was born in Dabhota village of Nalagarh, Himachal Pradesh to Rajinder Kaur and Chottu Ram. He was inspired by his cousin Rakesh who had already represented India in Kabaddi at international level. He married Sandeep Rana on April 10, 2019.

== Career ==
Ajay Thakur has been described as one of the best Indian raiders. He represented his employer Air India at the Industrial National Championships. He also captained the India team in 2017 and led them to gold. He led the Himachal men's team at the 67th Senior Nationals Kabaddi Championship 2020.

He is a member of Himachal Pradesh Police Service cadre where he currently serves as a deputy superintendent of police.

=== Pro Kabaddi League ===
In Season 1, Thakur played 15 matches and scored 122 raid points as well as 5 tackle points while playing for Bengaluru Bulls.

In season 2, Thakur played 13 matches and scored 79 raid points as well as 1 tackle point while playing for Bengaluru Bulls.

In season 3, Thakur played 14 matches and scored 52 raid points as well as 4 tackle points while playing for Puneri Paltan.

In season 4, Thakur played 16 matches and scored 63 raid points as well as 1 tackle point while playing for Puneri Paltan.

In season 5, Ajay Thakur played 22 matches and scored 213 raid points as well as 9 tackle points while playing for Tamil Thalaivas.

In season 6, Ajay Thakur played 22 matches and scored 203 raid points as well as 1 tackle point while playing for Tamil Thalaivas.

In season 7, Ajay Thakur played 13 matches and scored 58 raid points while playing for Tamil Thalaivas.

=== Kabaddi World Cup 2016 ===
He was the no.1 raider with most raid points and Ajay was the overall highest point scorer with 68 points.

India while playing Iran in the Kabaddi World Cup 2016 final, was in a trailing situation. In this situation, came Ajay scoring a 4-point raid to take India to the lead. He was also the Man of the Tournament in Kabaddi World Cup 2016.

Thakur was placed fourth among the best performing raiders in Season 1 of Pro kabaddi league.

== Achievements ==
His awards and achievements include:

- Asian Indoor and Martial Arts Games Kabaddi - Gold Medal [2013]
- Gold Medal at Kabaddi at the 2007 Asian Indoor Games
- 2014 Asian Games - Gold Medal.
- Asian Kabaddi Championship 2017(Gorgan, Iran) - Gold Medal.
- World Cup 2016 (Ahmedabad, India) - Gold medal
- Asian Games 2018 (Jakarta, Indonesia)- Bronze Medal
- Padma Shri award (2019)
- Arjuna Award (2019)
