= Tariq Saeed =

Pakistani cricket commentator

- طارق سعید
- Born: Sahiwall District
- Education: Forman Christian College
- Occupations: Cricket commentator; sports correspondent
- Employer: Deutsche Welle

Tariq Saeed (Urdu: طارق سعید) is a Pakistani cricket commentator and sports correspondent. He was born in Sahiwal District in Punjab, approximately 112 km (70 miles) from Lahore. Since 2020, he serves as one of the Urdu commentators in the Pakistan Super League. Moreover, he has commentated in the National T20 Cup, and has also written Urdu match reports for the ESPNcricinfo. He is also a sports correspondent for Deutsche Welle.

He is sometimes credited for reviving Urdu commentary in Pakistan.

== Early life and education ==
Born in Sahiwal, Saeed used to play cricket for the Forman Christian College team during his college days. While batting one day, a bouncer hit him just above his right eye, resulting in him leaving the game altogether. He then started commentating in domestic matches in Lahore.

== Career ==
Tariq Saeed started his commentary career from Radio Pakistan. He has also worked with other sports TV channels in the country, including PTV Sports. In addition to cricket commentary, Saeed has worked as a reporter for local Urdu newspapers and is a Deutsche Welle correspondent in Pakistan. He has also commentated on hockey matches and a Kabaddi World Cup final between India and Pakistan.

In January 2022, Saeed was part of an independent panel which selected the winners of the 2021 PCB Awards. On 22 January 2022, he was announced as one of the commentators for the seventh edition of PSL.

== Awards ==
Saeed has been nominated twice (in 2019 and 2021) for the Commentator of the Year award at the Best Pakistan Sports Awards.
