= Bhaini Bagha =

Coordinates: 30°03′N 75°22′E

Bhaini Bagha is a village in the Mansa district, Punjab, India. It is on the Mansa-Bathinda road 10 km from Mansa. A two-storey modern stone jail which will hold 550 prisoners was constructed there in 2009.An historical Gurudwara Sahib exists here which is related to Dhan Dhan Shri Guru Teg Bahadur Sahib Ji

Basketball game is played a lot in this village
