= Kakuwala =

- Village
- Location within Punjab
- Coordinates: 30°0′18.17″N 76°0′30.16″E
- Country: India
- State: Punjab
- District: Sangrur

Population (2011)
  - Total: 1,003

Languages
  - Official: Punjabi
- Time zone: UTC+5:30 (IST)
- PIN: 148036
- Telephone code: 91-1675

Kakuwala is a small village in Sunam block of Sangrur District in Punjab, India. It is situated on Sangrur-Patran National Highway - 71, about 30 km from Sangrur and 115 km from the state capital Chandigarh. To Kakuwala's north lie Dirba and Khetla, to south-west lie the village of Ladbanjara Kalan while to its south-east are Patran and Dugal. It is named after its founder landlord, Kaku Singh. Its population is about 1,000 in 153 households.

== Facilities ==
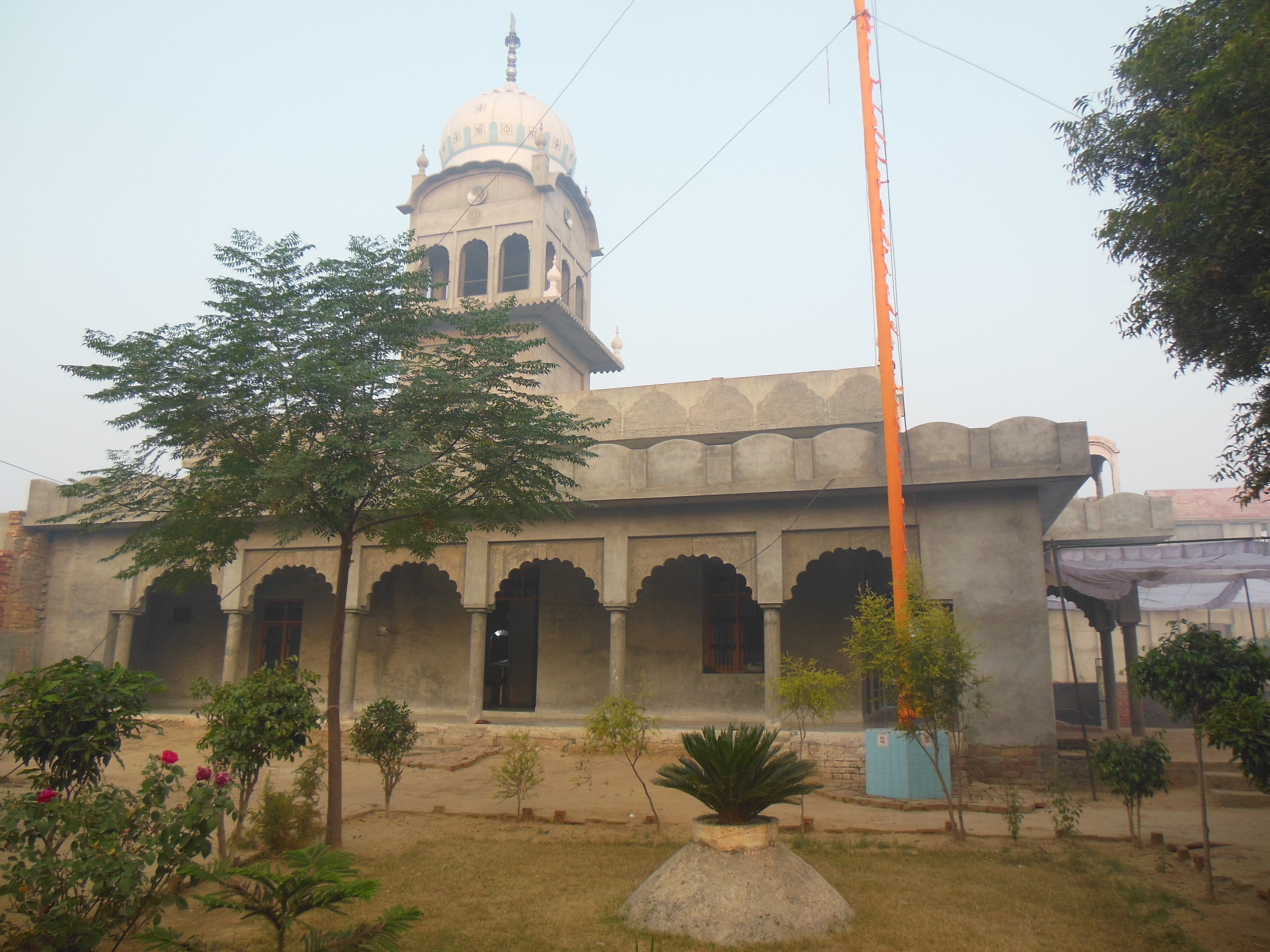
Gurdwara Sahib, Kakuwala

Kakuwala has a primary school, a gurudwara and a nirankari bhawan,
