= War Heroes Stadium =

Multi-purpose stadium in Sangrur, Punjab, India

- Location: Sangrur, Punjab
- Owner: Government of Punjab
- Capacity: 10,000
- Surface: Grass

Construction
- Opened: 2010

Tenants
- 2010 Kabaddi World Cup, 2013 Kabaddi World Cup

War Heroes Stadium is a multi-purpose stadium in Sangrur, Punjab. The stadium has hosted two Kabaddi World Cups in 2010 and 2013.

In 2013, the stadium was upgraded at the cost of 7 crore for laying the synthetic athletic track at the stadium which will be constructed by the National Building Construction Company.

The stadium will have state of the art sports facilities for games like taekwondo, badminton, lawn tennis and badminton in addition to the existing disciplines of athletics, boxing and volleyball with the association Sports Authority of India.
