= Shaheed Bhagat Singh Stadium =

Multi-purpose stadium in Firozpur, Punjab, India

Shaheed Bhagat Singh Stadium, Firozpur
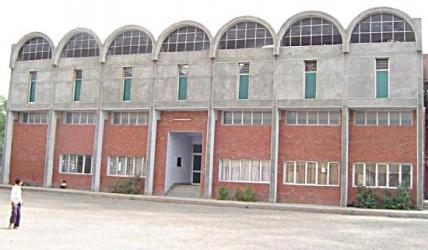
- View of Shaheed Bhagat Singh Stadium in Firozpur, Punjab, India
- Interactive map of Shaheed Bhagat Singh Stadium, Firozpur
- Full name: Shaheed Bhagat Singh Stadium
- Location: Firozpur, Punjab, India
- Coordinates: 30.946265616632086°N 74.61401417890642°E
- Owner: Government of Punjab
- Operator: Government of Punjab
- Capacity: 10,000

Construction
- Groundbreaking: 1962
- Built: 1989
- Opened: 1989
- Renovated: 2014
- Expanded: 2011

Shaheed Bhagat Singh Stadium is a multi-purpose stadium in Firozpur, Punjab, India. The stadium is mainly used for field hockey, and many Indian greats like Major Dhyan Chand, Gurinder Singh, Jograj Singh, Surjit Singh, and Bhagwant Singh have played here. The stadium was previously known as Nehru Park but was renamed after Shaheed Bhagat Singh.

== History ==
The ground also hosted two Ranji Trophy matches in 1961 and 1967. The ground was the home ground for Northern Punjab cricket team which played cricket from 1926 to 1967. The match against Southern Punjab cricket team in 1967 was the last match of the Northern Punjab cricket team in Ranji Trophy.

The stadium was one of 16 venues that were used for the 2011 Kabaddi World Cup.

In 2014, Chief Minister of Punjab Prakash Singh Badal laid the foundation for an AstroTurf surface on the ground which will help to improve the sports quality in the city. But stadium is in bad shape still, no work was done.

== Kabaddi matches host ==
12 November 2011
13:30

Canada	64 – 22	Nepal

Shaheed Bhagat Singh Stadium, Ferozepur

12 November 2011
14:30

Australia	0 - 1	Afghanistan

Shaheed Bhagat Singh Stadium, Ferozepur

- Australia forfeited. Afghanistan won by walkover because of the unavailability of the required minimum of players for Australia.

12 November 2011
16:30

United Kingdom	65 – 19	Germany

Shaheed Bhagat Singh Stadium, Ferozepur
