= 2010 Kabaddi World Cup (circle style) =

International kabaddi tournament in India

- Logo of the 2010 Kabaddi World Cup

Tournament information
- Dates: 3 April–12 April
- Administrator: Government of Punjab, India and Punjab Kabaddi Association; Recognised by International Kabaddi Federation
- Format: Circle Style
- Tournament format(s): Round-robin and Knockout
- Host(s): India
- Venue(s): 8 venues in 8 cities (List of Venues)
- Participants: 9 (List of Participants)

Final positions
- Champions: India (1st title)
- 1st runners-up: Pakistan
- 2nd runners-up: Canada

Tournament statistics
- Matches played: 20
- Best Raider: (Canada) Kuljeet Singh Malsian
- Best Stopper: (India) Mangat Singh Mangi

Pearls Kabaddi World Cup 2010 was the first international circle style kabaddi world cup and was held in Punjab, India.

== Teams ==
With the last-minute withdrawal of Norway, nine teams competed for the Prize Money Pearls World Cup Kabaddi Punjab-2010 hosted by the Punjab Government at different venues of the state from 3 to 12 April.

- Australia
- Canada
- India
- Iran
- Italy
- Pakistan
- Spain
- United Kingdom
- United States

== Pools ==
Announcing the draw, Organising Secretary Pargat Singh said that the teams would be divided into two pools. Hosts India were placed in Pool A while their traditional rivals Pakistan were in Pool B.

| Pool A | Pool B |
|---|---|
| India; United States; Australia; Italy; Iran | Pakistan; United Kingdom; Spain; Canada |

== Competition format ==
Nine teams competed in the tournament consisting of two rounds. In the first round, teams were divided into two pools of five and four teams, and followed round-robin format with each of the teams playing all other teams in the pool once.

Following the completion of the pool games, teams placed first and second in each pool advanced to a single elimination round consisting of two semifinal games, a third place play-off and a final.

== Venues ==
World Cup Kabaddi Punjab-2010 was held at various districts of Punjab from 3–12 April 2010. The venues were as follows:

- Yadvindra Public School Stadium, Patiala
- War Heroes Stadium, Sangrur
- Guru Gobind Singh Stadium, Jalandhar
- Lajwanti Stadium, Hoshiarpur
- Government College Stadium, Gurdaspur
- Guru Nanak Stadium, Amritsar
- Sports Stadium, Bathinda
- Guru Nanak Stadium, Ludhiana

== Prize money ==
The winning team received a cash award of ₹1 crore besides a glittering rolling trophy. Runners-up took ₹51 lakh and third-place winners ₹21 lakh.

The fourth position were worth ₹10 lakh. Besides, individual awards (tractors) and other prizes were also given among the winners. Each team also got a sum of Rs 5 lakh as appearance money.

== Schedule ==
All matches' timings are according to Indian Standard Time (UTC +5:30).

=== Group stage ===
==== Pool A ====
| Team | Matches Played | Won | Drawn | Lost | Points |
|---|---|---|---|---|---|
| India | 4 | 4 | 0 | 0 | 8 |
| Italy | 4 | 3 | 0 | 1 | 6 |
| United States | 4 | 2 | 0 | 2 | 4 |
| Australia | 4 | 1 | 0 | 3 | 2 |
| Iran | 4 | 0 | 0 | 4 | 0 |

Qualified for semifinals

3 April 2010
21:40

| India | 62 - 26 | United States |

YPS Stadium, Patiala

4 April 2010
14:50

| Italy | 63 - 24 | Iran |

War Heroes Stadium, Sangrur

5 April 2010
16:00

| United States | 47 - 43 | Australia |

Guru Gobind Singh Stadium, Jalandhar

5 April 2010
17:00

| India | 61 - 29 | Italy |

Guru Gobind Singh Stadium, Jalandhar

6 April 2010
14:50

| United States | 62 - 24 | Iran |

Lajwanti Stadium, Hoshiarpur

6 April 2010
17:00

| India | 58 - 29 | Australia |

Lajwanti Stadium, Hoshiarpur

7 April 2010
14:50

| Italy | 47 - 43 | Australia |

Government College Stadium, Gurdaspur

7 April 2010
16:00

| Iran | 28 - 62 | India |

Government College Stadium, Gurdaspur

8 April 2010
14:50

| Iran | 26 - 57 | Australia |

Guru Nanak Stadium, Amritsar

8 April 2010
16:00

| United States | 43 - 45 | Italy |

Guru Nanak Stadium, Amritsar

==== Pool B ====
| Team | Matches Played | Won | Drawn | Lost | Points |
|---|---|---|---|---|---|
| Pakistan | 3 | 3 | 0 | 0 | 6 |
| Canada | 3 | 2 | 0 | 1 | 4 |
| United Kingdom | 3 | 1 | 0 | 2 | 2 |
| Spain | 3 | 0 | 0 | 3 | 0 |

Qualified for semifinals

4 April 2010
16:00

| Pakistan | 47 - 38 | Canada |

War Heroes Stadium, Sangrur

4 April 2010
17:00

| United Kingdom | 47 - 28 | Spain |

War Heroes Stadium, Sangrur

5 April 2010
14:50

| Canada | 66 - 28 | Spain |

Guru Gobind Singh Stadium, Jalandhar

6 April 2010
16:00

| Pakistan | 61 - 31 | Spain |

Lajwanti Stadium, Hoshiarpur

7 April 2010
17:00

| United Kingdom | 29 - 49 | Canada |

Government College Stadium, Gurdaspur

8 April 2010
17:00

| Pakistan | 50 - 23 | United Kingdom |

Guru Nanak Stadium, Amritsar

=== Knockout stage ===
Semi-finals
10 April – Sports Stadium, Bathinda
Pakistan | 57
Italy | 33
10 April – Sports Stadium, Bathinda
India | 51
Canada | 36

Final
12 April – Guru Nanak Stadium, Ludhiana
Pakistan | 24
India | 58
Third place
12 April – Guru Nanak Stadium, Ludhiana
Italy | 22
Canada | 66

==== Semi-finals ====
10 April 2010
15:05

| Pakistan | 57 - 33 | Italy |

Sports Stadium, Bathinda

10 April 2010
16:35

| India | 51 - 36 | Canada |

Sports Stadium, Bathinda

==== Third-place playoff ====
12 April 2010
17:30

| Italy | 22 - 66 | Canada |

Guru Nanak Stadium, Ludhiana

==== Final ====
12 April 2010
19:30

| Pakistan | 24 - 58 | India |

Guru Nanak Stadium, Ludhiana

2010 Kabaddi World Cup
| 1st Runners-up | Champions | 2nd Runners-up |
| Pakistan | India; First title | Canada |

== Broadcasting rights ==
India: Punjab Television Channel (PTC) had the broadcasting rights in India and Asia.

== Winners ==
India won the Kabaddi World Cup by defeating Pakistan in an interesting match on 12 April 2010 at Guru Nanak Stadium, Ludhiana and won ₹1 Crore as a Prize money and a glittering Golden World Cup Trophy. Pakistani team was paid ₹51 lakh as prize money and a Silver Cup Trophy. The best stopper award was won by Indian Captain Mangat Singh Manga and Best Raider award won by Kulwinder Singh Kinda of Canada. Both players were given tractors as an award. Mr. Parkash Singh Badal was heard to pay ₹5,000 to each player for every point but in the end this amount was reduced to ₹2,000. A government job was also announced for each Indian player.
