= 2023 Asian Kabaddi Championship =

International team sports championship

Tournament information
- Dates: 27–30 June 2023
- Format: Standard style
- Host(s): Busan, South Korea
- Venue: Dong-Eui Science University - Indoor Gymnasium
- Participants: 6

Final positions
- Champions: India (8th title)
- 1st runners-up: Iran
- 2nd runners-up: Chinese Taipei

The 11th Edition of Asian Kabaddi Championship was held at Busan, Republic of Korea from 27 June to 30 June 2023. Indian men's team won the event by defeating Iran in the final 42–32.

== Tournament ==
This is overall the 11th edition, first edition was held in 1980. 2023 edition is 1st ever to be held in Republic of Korea, 6 countries participated in the men's event at the tournament. India is the most successful nation with 8 titles, including this event's title.

== Participating nations ==
6 Countries participated in the tournament. It was held in single legged round robbin format.

- Chinese Taipei
- Hong Kong
- India
- Iran
- Japan
- South Korea

== Group Stage ==
=== Preliminary ===
Team	Pld	W	D	L	SF	SA	SD	Pts	Qualification
India	5	5	0	0	288	97	191	10	Advanced to final
Iran	5	4	0	1	282	122	160	8	Advanced to final
Chinese Taipei	5	3	0	2	271	171	100	6	
Japan	5	2	0	3	189	198	-9	4	
South Korea (H)	5	1	0	4	168	279	-111	2	
Hong Kong	5	0	0	5	90	421	-331	0	

(H) Host

27 June 2023
06:30 IST

Chinese Taipei	28–52	Iran

Dong-Eui Science University - Indoor Gymnasium

27 June 2023
10:30 IST

India	76–13	South Korea

Dong-Eui Science University - Indoor Gymnasium

27 June 2023
11:30 IST

Japan	85–11	Hong Kong

Dong-Eui Science University - Indoor Gymnasium

27 June 2023
12:30 IST

India	53–19	Chinese Taipei

Dong-Eui Science University - Indoor Gymnasium

28 June 2023
06:30 IST

Hong Kong	31–60	Iran

Dong-Eui Science University - Indoor Gymnasium

28 June 2023
07:30 IST

South Korea	18–45	Japan

Dong-Eui Science University - Indoor Gymnasium

28 June 2023
10:30 IST

Chinese Taipei	117–12	Hong Kong

Dong-Eui Science University - Indoor Gymnasium

28 June 2023
11:30 IST

India	62–17	Japan

Dong-Eui Science University - Indoor Gymnasium

28 June 2023
12:30 IST

South Korea	17–72	Iran

Dong-Eui Science University - Indoor Gymnasium

29 June 2023
06:30 IST

Chinese Taipei	37–29	Japan

Dong-Eui Science University - Indoor Gymnasium

29 June 2023
07:30 IST

South Korea	95–16	Hong Kong

Dong-Eui Science University - Indoor Gymnasium

(postponed to 30 June, 10:30 IST)

29 June 2023
10:30 IST

India	33–28	Iran

Dong-Eui Science University - Indoor Gymnasium

29 June 2023
11:30 IST

Chinese Taipei	70–25	South Korea

Dong-Eui Science University - Indoor Gymnasium

30 June 2023
06:30 IST

Japan	13–70	Iran

Dong-Eui Science University - Indoor Gymnasium

(postponed to 30 June, 7:30 IST)

30 June 2023
07:30 IST

India	64–20	Hong Kong

Dong-Eui Science University - Indoor Gymnasium

(preponed to 30 June 6:30 IST)

== Final ==
30 June 2023
10:30 IST

India	42–32	Iran

Dong-Eui Science University - Indoor Gymnasium

(postponed to 30 June, 11:30 IST)

== Medalists ==
Event	Gold	Silver	Bronze
Men	India	Iran	Chinese Taipei
