= India national kabaddi team =

Indian men's kabaddi team

- Captain: Sunil Kumar
- Most caps: Ajay Thakur (110)

World Cup
- 3 (first in 2004)
- (gold) 1st (2004, 2007, 2016)

Asian Games
- 10 (first in 1990)
- (gold) 1st (1990, 1994, 1998, 2002, 2006, 2010, 2014, 2022, 2026)

Asian Championship
- 9 (first in 1980)
- (gold) 1st (1980, 1988, 2000, 2001, 2002, 2005, 2017, 2023)
Medal record
Event	1st	2nd	3rd
World Cup	3	0	0
Kabaddi World Cup	2	0	0
Circle World Cup	6	1	0
Asian Games	9	0	1
Asian Championship	8	0	0
Asian Indoor Games	3	0	0
Asian Beach Games	2	2	2
Circle Asia Cup	1	2	0
Commonwealth Championship	1	0	0
South Asian Games	10	1	0
Total	45	6	3
World Cup
Gold medal – first place	2004 India	
Gold medal – first place	2007 India	
Gold medal – first place	2016 India	
Kabaddi World Cup
Gold medal – first place	2019 Malaysia	
Gold medal – first place	2025 England	
Circle World Cup
Gold medal – first place	2010 India	
Gold medal – first place	2011 India	
Gold medal – first place	2012 India	
Gold medal – first place	2013 India	
Gold medal – first place	2014 India	
Gold medal – first place	2016 India	
Silver medal – second place	2020 Pakistan	
Asian Games
Gold medal – first place	1990 Beijing	
Gold medal – first place	1994 Hiroshima	
Gold medal – first place	1998 Bangkok	
Gold medal – first place	2002 Busan	
Gold medal – first place	2006 Doha	
Gold medal – first place	2010 Guangzhou	
Gold medal – first place	2014 Incheon	
Gold medal – first place	2022 Hangzhou	
Gold medal – first place	2026 Aichi–Nagoya	
Bronze medal – third place	2018 Jakarta	
Asian Championship
Gold medal – first place	1980 India	
Gold medal – first place	1988 India	
Gold medal – first place	2000 Sri Lanka	
Gold medal – first place	2001 Thailand	
Gold medal – first place	2002 Malaysia	
Gold medal – first place	2005 Iran	
Gold medal – first place	2017 Iran	
Gold medal – first place	2023 South Korea	
Asian Indoor Games
Gold medal – first place	2007 Macau	
Gold medal – first place	2009 Hanoi	
Gold medal – first place	2013 Incheon	
Asian Beach Games
Gold medal – first place	2008 Bali	
Gold medal – first place	2010 Muscat	
Silver medal – second place	2016 Danang	
Silver medal – second place	2026 Sanya	
Bronze medal – third place	2012 Haiyang	
Bronze medal – third place	2014 Phuket	
Circle Asia Cup
Gold medal – first place	2011 Iran	
Silver medal – second place	2012 Pakistan	
Silver medal – second place	2016 Pakistan	
Commonwealth Championship
Gold medal – first place	2026 Ahmedabad	
South Asian Games
Gold medal – first place	1985 Dhaka	
Gold medal – first place	1987 Calcutta	
Gold medal – first place	1989 Islamabad	
Silver medal – second place	1993 Dhaka	
Gold medal – first place	1995 Madras	
Gold medal – first place	1999 Kathmandu	
Gold medal – first place	2004 Islamabad	
Gold medal – first place	2006 Colombo	
Gold medal – first place	2010 Dhaka	
Gold medal – first place	2016 Guwahati	
Gold medal – first place	2019 Kathmandu–Pokhara	
Dubai Kabaddi Masters
Gold medal – first place	2018 Dubai	

The India men's national kabaddi team represents India in international men's kabaddi competitions. Governed by the Amateur Kabaddi Federation of India (AKFI), established in 1972, the team is the most successful national kabaddi side in history, having secured gold medals at the Asian Games in nine out of ten editions since the sport's inclusion in 1990. India has also won all three Kabaddi World Cup (standard style) editions in 2004, 2007, and 2016, defeating Iran in each final, and the 2025 Kabaddi World Cup organised by World Kabaddi, defeating England 44–41 in the final. Additionally, the team has won the Asian Kabaddi Championship eight times across nine men's editions and the inaugural Commonwealth Kabaddi Championship in 2026, beating Sri Lanka 54–20 in the final.

India's success has been built on deep cultural roots in the sport, structured coaching through the AKFI, and a pipeline of players that has existed in the Pro Kabaddi League (PKL) since 2014. Legendary players such as Rakesh Kumar, Anup Kumar, and Ajay Thakur shaped the team's early years, while current stars such as Pawan Sehrawat, Arjun Deshwal and Naveen Kumar lead India's team today. Sunil Kumar captained the side at the 2026 Asian Games, with Pawan Sehrawat as vice-captain.

== History ==
=== Origins and early development ===
Kabaddi, an indigenous contact sport originating in ancient India, traces its roots to prehistoric times, with references in Hindu epics like the Mahabharata. The game's modern standardised form emerged in the early 20th century, particularly in Maharashtra, where basic rules were formalised in 1921 and refined in 1923. These developments enabled the inaugural All India Kabaddi Tournament in 1923, marking the shift from informal rural contests to structured competitions.

The formation of the All India Kabaddi Federation in 1950 was a pivotal step in institutionalising the sport, compiling uniform rules and promoting it across the country. This was followed by the launch of the Senior National Kabaddi Championship in 1952, which served as a key platform for identifying talent. In 1972, the Amateur Kabaddi Federation of India (AKFI) was established, replacing the earlier body and gaining affiliation with the Indian Olympic Association, thereby enhancing governance and resources for player development.

Early international exposure for Indian kabaddi players began with a demonstration at the 1936 Berlin Olympics, where a team from the Hanuman Vyayam Prasarak Mandal in Amravati, Maharashtra, showcased the sport during a physical education congress. The sport appeared as a demonstration event at the 1951 Asian Games in New Delhi, providing further visibility. The first formal test series involving a representative Indian team occurred in 1974, when India toured Bangladesh for a five-match bilateral series, winning 4–1. A further demonstration at the 1982 Asian Games set the stage for kabaddi's inclusion as a medal sport in 1990.

=== Rise to dominance (1980s–2000s) ===
The Indian national kabaddi team began establishing its international presence through the inaugural Asian Kabaddi Championship, held in Calcutta in 1980, where India secured the gold medal by defeating Bangladesh in the final. This victory marked the start of India's dominance in the regional competition, followed by another gold in 1988 in Jaipur, again overcoming Bangladesh. Kabaddi also gained visibility as a demonstration sport at the 1982 Asian Games in New Delhi, contributing to the sport's inclusion as a full medal event in subsequent editions.

Kabaddi was contested at the Asian Games as a competitive sport for the first time in 1990. India beat Bangladesh in the gold medal match at both the 1990 Asian Games and 1994 Asian Games. India lost to Pakistan in the 1993 South Asian Games gold medal match. In the 1998 Asian Games held in Bangkok, the team beat arch rivals Pakistan for the gold medal, establishing an unbroken streak of three Asian Games victories.

Entering the 2000s, India's dominance intensified. India beat Bangladesh in the gold medal match of the 2002 Asian Games, held in Busan. India won the inaugural Kabaddi World Cup in 2004 in Mumbai, beating Iran by a 55–27 margin. They repeated the feat three years later in Panvel, beating the Iranians 29–19. At the 2006 Asian Games, India beat Pakistan 35–23 to win their fifth consecutive gold medal at the tournament. These triumphs, often against strong regional foes like Iran and Pakistan, were bolstered by the AKFI's structured coaching and national camps, transforming kabaddi from a regional pastime into India's flagship contact sport.

=== Modern era (2010s–present) ===
The modern era has been marked by sustained dominance bolstered by the professionalisation of the sport through the Pro Kabaddi League (PKL), which launched in 2014 and provided a high-profile platform for talent development and exposure. In the 2010 and 2014 Asian Games, India continued to dominate, winning gold on both occasions—defeating Iran 37–20 in the 2010 final and overcoming Iran 27–25 in 2014 to secure their seventh consecutive title. The PKL's influence became evident as national team players like Anup Kumar and Ajay Thakur transitioned seamlessly between league and international duties.

When the Kabaddi World Cup resumed in 2016 after a nine-year hiatus, India beat Iran for the third final in a row by 38–29 at Ahmedabad's TransStadia Arena.

In 2017, India won the Asian Kabaddi Championship led by raider Ajay Thakur with raider Pardeep Narwal bagging a super 10, beating Pakistan in the final by 36–22. India won the 2018 Dubai Kabaddi Masters tournament, beating Iran 44–26 in the final.

A rare setback occurred at the 2018 Asian Games in Jakarta. India lost to South Korea 23–24 in the group stages—the team's first ever loss in Asian Games history. Despite the loss, India qualified for the semi-finals but lost 27–18 to Iran, who went on to win the gold, leaving India with bronze.

India won the gold at the 2019 South Asian Games led by Deepak Niwas Hooda, beating Sri Lanka in the final by 51–18, with raiders Pawan Sehrawat, Naveen Kumar, and Pardeep Narwal.

The Indian team did not play in any tournaments for a prolonged period from December 2019 due to the COVID-19 pandemic. India's resurgence began in 2023, when they won the Asian Kabaddi Championship by defeating Iran 42–32 in the final. India then reasserted supremacy at the 2022 Asian Games in Hangzhou, where the men's team defeated Iran 33–29 in the final to claim their eighth gold, avenging the 2018 loss.

In 2024, the Indian national kabaddi team was barred from all international competitions following the suspension of the AKFI by the IKF due to governance disputes and delays in federation elections. This ban extended to events such as the inaugural Senior World Beach Kabaddi Championship held in September in Iran.

The ban was lifted in May 2025 after resolutions in AKFI's executive structure. Prior to the lift, in March 2025, the men's team participated in the 2025 Kabaddi World Cup organised by World Kabaddi in Wolverhampton, United Kingdom (not sanctioned by the IKF), clinching the title with a 44–41 win over host nation England in the final. The group stage included a 64–22 opening win over Italy and a 64–64 draw against Scotland.

India's youth programmes also excelled in 2025. At the Asian Youth Games in Bahrain in October, the U-18 boys' team defeated Iran 35–32 in the final to claim gold, while the U-18 girls' team defeated Iran 75–21.

At the 2026 Asian Beach Games in Sanya in April 2026, the men's team won silver after losing the final to Iran.

At the 2026 Asian Games in Aichi–Nagoya, a 12-man squad captained by Sunil Kumar and including only four members of the 2022 gold-medal team went unbeaten. India topped Group A with wins over Japan (49–24), Bangladesh (48–25), South Korea (63–31) and Chinese Taipei (37–21), then beat Thailand 66–28 in the semi-final. In the final on 26 September at the Tokai Citizens Gymnasium, India defeated Iran 40–34 to retain the title and claim a ninth Asian Games gold.

In October 2026 a new-look squad led by Surjeet Singh, with Naveen Kumar as vice-captain and none of the Asian Games gold medallists, won the inaugural Commonwealth Kabaddi Championship in Ahmedabad, finishing unbeaten in eight matches. India topped Group A with six wins, then beat Bangladesh 56–27 in the semi-final and Sri Lanka 54–20 in the final on 31 October.

== Governing body and formats ==
=== Amateur Kabaddi Federation of India ===
The Amateur Kabaddi Federation of India (AKFI) serves as the apex national governing body for kabaddi in India, regulating all forms of the sport including circle, national, indoor, and beach variants. Established in 1972, it succeeded the earlier All India Kabaddi Federation (formed in 1950). Headquartered in Jaipur, Rajasthan, AKFI is affiliated with the Indian Olympic Association (IOA), the Asian Kabaddi Federation (AKF), and the International Kabaddi Federation (IKF), enabling India's participation in continental and global events.

AKFI's primary objectives include organising domestic competitions, enforcing standardised rules, and fostering player development from grassroots to elite levels through collaborations with state-level associations. It conducts key events such as the Senior National Kabaddi Championship and Junior National Championships, which serve as platforms for talent scouting and selection for the national teams. The AKFI organised the 2026 Commonwealth Kabaddi Championship with the approval of the IKF.

In 2024, AKFI faced a temporary suspension from the IKF, barring Indian teams from global competitions due to administrative disputes, which was resolved following judicial intervention. Governance challenges led to the appointment of Justice (Retd.) S.P. Garg as administrator by the Delhi High Court in 2018. On 6 February 2025, the Supreme Court of India directed the administrator to transfer control back to the elected executive committee, and the handover was completed, leading to the IKF lifting the suspension in March 2025.

=== Kabaddi variants represented ===
The India national kabaddi team represents the country in two primary variants of the sport: Standard style and Circle style.

Standard style, also known as the international or mat-based format, is played on a rectangular 13 m × 10 m court with seven players per side in 40-minute matches divided into two 20-minute halves. This variant is governed internationally by the International Kabaddi Federation (IKF) and forms the basis for major competitions like the Asian Games and the Kabaddi World Cup (standard style).

Circle style, often referred to as Punjabi or traditional outdoor kabaddi, is contested on a large circular field approximately 70 m in circumference without a mat, focusing on athleticism, speed, and direct confrontations. This variant is overseen by the Amateur Circle Kabaddi Federation of India (ACKFI) and is prominently featured in the Kabaddi World Cup (circle style).

== Tournament history ==
=== Standard kabaddi ===
==== World Cup ====
The Kabaddi World Cup, organised by the International Kabaddi Federation, is the premier international tournament in the standard style of kabaddi. India has participated in all editions held to date and maintained an undefeated record through 2016, securing victory in every final against Iran.

The inaugural men's Kabaddi World Cup in 2004, held in Mumbai, featured five teams. India topped Pool A before clinching the title with a commanding 55–27 victory over Iran in the final. The 2007 edition, expanded to 14 teams and hosted in Panvel, saw India defeat Iran 29–19 in the final. In 2016, India staged a comeback from a halftime deficit to beat Iran 38–29 in the final at Ahmedabad.

Year	Rank	M	W	D	L	PF	PA	PD
(India) 2004	Champions	5	5	0	0	289	104	+185
(India) 2007	Champions	5	5	0	0	276	115	+161
(India) 2016	Champions	6	5	0	1	275	150	+125
Total	3/3	16	15	0	1	840	369	+471

==== Asian Games ====
The India national kabaddi team has achieved unparalleled dominance at the Asian Games, where kabaddi was introduced as a medal discipline in 1990 for men. The men's team has secured gold medals in nine out of ten editions contested through 2026, including a streak of seven consecutive golds from 1990 to 2014, interrupted only by a bronze medal in 2018, before reclaiming the top spot in 2022 and retaining it in 2026 with a 40–34 win over Iran in the final.

Year	Rank	M	W	D	L
(China) 1990	Champions	5	5	0	0
(Japan) 1994	Champions	4	4	0	0
(Thailand) 1998	Champions	6	6	0	0
(South Korea) 2002	Champions	5	5	0	0
(Qatar) 2006	Champions	5	5	0	0
(China) 2010	Champions	4	4	0	0
(South Korea) 2014	Champions	5	5	0	0
(Indonesia) 2018	Third place	5	3	0	2
(China) 2022	Champions	6	6	0	0
(Japan) 2026	Champions	6	6	0	0
Total	10/10	51	49	0	2

==== Asian Kabaddi Championship ====
The Asian Kabaddi Championship, organised by the Asian Kabaddi Federation, serves as a key competition for senior national kabaddi teams across Asia. India has achieved remarkable dominance, capturing the championship in eight out of nine editions up to 2023, with the only loss occurring in 2003 when Iran emerged victorious.

Asian Kabaddi Championship
Year	Host country	Position
1980	India	(gold) 1st
1988	India	(gold) 1st
2000	Sri Lanka	(gold) 1st
2001	Thailand	(gold) 1st
2002	Malaysia	(gold) 1st
2003	Malaysia	Group stage
2005	Iran	(gold) 1st
2017	Iran	(gold) 1st
2023	South Korea	(gold) 1st

==== Commonwealth Kabaddi Championship ====
The inaugural Commonwealth Kabaddi Championship was held at the Veer Savarkar Sports Complex in Ahmedabad from 23 to 31 October 2026, with 13 men's teams competing. India won all eight matches, scoring 380 points and conceding 193.

Year	Rank	M	W	D	L
(India) 2026	Champions	8	8	0	0
Total	1/1	8	8	0	0

==== South Asian Games ====
The men's team has secured gold medals across multiple editions of the South Asian Games, with 10 golds and one silver, underscoring India's unchallenged position among South Asian nations. At the 2019 edition in Kathmandu, the men's squad culminated with a decisive 51–18 victory over Sri Lanka in the final to claim their 10th title. The next edition, originally scheduled for January 2026 in Pakistan, was postponed to March 2027.

South Asian Games
Year	Host city	Position
1985	Dhaka, Bangladesh	(gold) 1st
1987	Kolkata, India	(gold) 1st
1989	Islamabad, Pakistan	(gold) 1st
1993	Dhaka, Bangladesh	(silver) 2nd
1995	Madras, India	(gold) 1st
1999	Kathmandu, Nepal	(gold) 1st
2004	Islamabad, Pakistan	(gold) 1st
2006	Colombo, Sri Lanka	(gold) 1st
2010	Dhaka, Bangladesh	(gold) 1st
2016	Guwahati & Shillong, India	(gold) 1st
2019	Kathmandu, Pokhara & Janakpur, Nepal	(gold) 1st

==== Dubai Kabaddi Masters ====
Year	Rank	Pld	W	D	L
(United Arab Emirates) 2018	Champions	6	6	0	0
Total	1/1	6	6	0	0

=== World kabaddi ===
==== World Cup ====
Year	Rank	Pld	W	D	L
(Malaysia) 2019	Champions	9	9	0	0
(England) 2025	Champions	7	6	1	0
Total	2/2	16	15	1	0

=== Beach kabaddi ===
==== World Championship ====
World Beach Kabaddi Championship
Year	Host country	Position
2024	Iran	DNP

==== Asian Beach Games ====
Year	Rank	Pld	W	D	L
(Indonesia) 2008	Champions	6	5	1	0
(Oman) 2010	Champions	6	6	0	0
(China) 2012	Third place	3	1	0	2
(Thailand) 2014	Third place	4	2	0	2
(Vietnam) 2016	Runners-up	4	2	1	1
(China) 2026	Runners-up	5	4	0	1
Total	6/6	28	20	2	6

==== South Asian Beach Games ====
Year	Rank	Pld	W	D	L
(Sri Lanka) 2011	Runners-up	4	2	0	2
Total	1/1	4	2	0	2

=== Indoor kabaddi ===
==== Asian Indoor and Martial Arts Games ====
Year	Rank	Pld	W	D	L
(Macau) 2007	Champions	7	7	0	0
(Vietnam) 2009	Champions	5	5	0	0
(South Korea) 2013	Champions	6	6	0	0
(South Korea) 2013	Participated as (International Olympic Committee) Independent Olympic Athletes (IOA)				
Total	3/3	18	18	0	0

=== Circle kabaddi ===
==== Circle World Cup ====
Year	Rank	Pld	W	D	L
(India) 2010	Champions	6	6	0	0
(India) 2011	Champions	8	8	0	0
(India) 2012	Champions	5	5	0	0
(India) 2013	Champions	6	6	0	0
(India) 2014	Champions	6	6	0	0
(India) 2016	Champions	7	7	0	0
(Pakistan) 2020	Runners-up	6	5	0	1
Total	7/7	44	43	0	1

==== Circle Asian Cup ====
Year	Rank	Pld	W	D	L
(India) 2011	Champions	5	5	0	0
(India) 2012	Runners-up	5	4	0	1
(India) 2016	Runners-up	5	4	0	1
Total	3/3	15	13	0	2

== Recent results and fixtures ==
=== Recent results ===
Event	Dates	Venue	Result
Commonwealth Kabaddi Championship	23–31 October 2026	Ahmedabad, India	Champions (beat Sri Lanka 54–20 in final)
Asian Games	21–26 September 2026	Aichi–Nagoya, Japan	Champions (beat Iran 40–34 in final)
Asian Beach Games	April 2026	Sanya, China	Runners-up (lost to Iran in final)

=== Upcoming schedule ===
Event	Dates	Venue
South Asian Games (Kabaddi)	23–31 March 2027	Islamabad, Lahore, Faisalabad, Pakistan

== Current squad ==
The following squad won gold at the 2026 Asian Games. It comprised four raiders, two all-rounders (Pawan Sehrawat and Aslam Inamdar) and six defenders.

Player	Role
Sunil Kumar (Captain)	Defender
Pawan Sehrawat (Vice-captain)	All-rounder
Aslam Inamdar	All-rounder
Arjun Deshwal	Raider
Ashu Malik	
Ayan Lohchab	Raider
Devank Dalal	Raider
Ankit Jaglan	
Jaideep Dahiya	
Rahul Sethpal	
Gaurav Khatri	
Sumit Sangwan	

For the 2026 Commonwealth Kabaddi Championship, India named a separate 14-member squad led by Surjeet Singh (captain) and Naveen Kumar (vice-captain); none of the 12 Asian Games gold medallists were included.

== Coaching staff ==
The coaching staff is appointed by the AKFI for national coaching camps and international competitions.

Position	Name
Head coach	(India) Rambir Singh Khokhar
Assistant Coaches	(India) Srinivas Reddy
Assistant Coaches	(India) E. Bhaskaran
Team Manager	(India) E. Prasad Rao

For the 2026 Commonwealth Kabaddi Championship, the head coach was J. Udaya Kumar.

== Infrastructure ==
=== International grounds ===
The India national kabaddi team does not have a single designated home ground but relies on a network of premier indoor stadiums and sports complexes across the country for hosting trials, training camps, and international competitions. The 2026 Commonwealth Kabaddi Championship was held at the Veer Savarkar Sports Complex in Ahmedabad.

Locations of stadiums which have hosted international kabaddi matches in India

Stadium	City	State	Capacity	Matches hosted	Notes
Indira Gandhi Arena	New Delhi	Delhi	14,000	Kabaddi World Cup, Pro Kabaddi League, international friendlies	One of the largest indoor arenas in India; key venue for international events and team trials
Patliputra Sports Complex	Patna	Bihar	3,500	Pro Kabaddi League, national tournaments	Regular Pro Kabaddi League venue; hosted several international fixtures
Gachibowli Indoor Stadium	Hyderabad	Telangana	4,000	Asian Games training, Pro Kabaddi League	Modern facility with floodlighting and cushioned mats
Balewadi Stadium	Pune	Maharashtra	11,000	Kabaddi Masters, Pro Kabaddi League	Multi-purpose stadium with indoor facilities used for international kabaddi

=== Training facilities ===
The Indian national kabaddi team primarily utilises training facilities managed by the Sports Authority of India (SAI), which oversees a network of National Centres of Excellence (NCOEs) and regional centres dedicated to elite athlete development. These facilities provide specialised infrastructure for kabaddi, including indoor mats, strength and conditioning gyms, physiotherapy units, and boarding accommodations.

A key hub for kabaddi training is the SAI NCOE at Gandhinagar, Gujarat, which is explicitly designated for kabaddi alongside handball and kho-kho. In 2025, a senior women's national coaching camp was held here from 27 October to 13 November, selecting probable players for upcoming events. The men's squad for the 2026 Asian Games also prepared there from 5 to 15 September 2026.

Additional national coaching camps occur at other SAI regional centres, including the Northern Regional Centre in Sonepat, Haryana, which has hosted youth and senior camps, and the SAI Southern Centre in Bengaluru, Karnataka, which offers advanced sports science support including biomechanics labs.

== Honours ==
=== World ===
- World Cup – Standard style:
  - Champions (3): 2004, 2007, 2016
- Kabaddi World Cup (World Kabaddi):
  - Champions (2): 2019, 2025
- World Cup – Circle style:
  - Champions (6): 2010, 2011, 2012, 2013, 2014, 2016
  - Runners-up (1): 2020

=== Commonwealth ===
- Commonwealth Kabaddi Championship:
  - Champions (1): 2026

=== Asia ===
- Asian Kabaddi Championship:
  - Champions (8): 1980, 1988, 2000, 2001, 2002, 2005, 2017, 2023
- Asian Games:
  - Gold Medal (9): 1990, 1994, 1998, 2002, 2006, 2010, 2014, 2022, 2026
  - Bronze Medal (1): 2018
- Asian Indoor Games:
  - Gold Medal (3): 2007, 2009, 2013
- Asian Beach Games:
  - Gold Medal (2): 2008, 2010
  - Silver Medal (2): 2016, 2026
  - Bronze Medal (2): 2012, 2014

=== South Asia ===
- South Asian Games:
  - Gold Medal (10): 1985, 1987, 1989, 1995, 1999, 2004, 2006, 2010, 2016, 2019
  - Silver Medal (1): 1993

=== Other tournaments ===
- Dubai Kabaddi Masters:
  - Champions (1): 2018

== Individual accolades ==
Indian players representing the national kabaddi team have earned numerous individual honours, primarily through India's National Sports Awards, recognising excellence in performance, leadership, and contributions to the sport.

The Arjuna Award, India's second-highest sporting honour, has been conferred on 37 kabaddi players as of 2024, with many recipients being key members of the national team. Notable recipients include Sahanand Mahadev Shetty, the first kabaddi player to receive it in 1972; Ajay Thakur in 2019; Anup Kumar in 2012; and Pawan Sehrawat in 2023. Other prominent awardees include Rakesh Kumar (2005), Manjeet Chhillar (2015), Jasvir Singh (2017), and Deepak Niwas Hooda (2020).

Two national team players have received the Padma Shri, the fourth-highest civilian award: Sunil Dabas in 2014 and Ajay Thakur in 2019.

The Dhyan Chand Award for lifetime achievement has honoured several retired national team players, including Shamsher Singh (2007), Manpreet Singh (2020), Vikas Kumar (2021), and BC Suresh (2022).

Award	Year	Recipient	Notable contribution
Padma Shri	2014	Sunil Dabas	Defensive anchor in multiple Asian Games golds
Padma Shri	2019	Ajay Thakur	Captained team to 2014 Asian Games gold and Asian Championships
Dhyan Chand Award	2007	Shamsher Singh	Key player in 1990 and 1998 Asian Games victories
Dhyan Chand Award	2020	Manpreet Singh	Star raider in 2002 and 2006 Asian Games golds
Dhyan Chand Award	2021	Vikas Kumar	Defensive leader in 2010 Asian Games and World Cups
Dhyan Chand Award	2022	BC Suresh	All-rounder in 2002 Asian Games and early championships

== Players ==
=== Captains ===
List of Indian kabaddi captains
- Rakesh Kumar (2006–2010)
- Anup Kumar (2010–2016)
- Ajay Thakur (2016–2018)
- Deepak Niwas Hooda (2019–2022)
- Pawan Sehrawat (2023–2026)
- Sunil Kumar (2026–present)

Rakesh Kumar guided the men's team to gold medals at the Asian Games in 2006 and 2010. Anup Kumar, nicknamed "Captain Cool", led the team to gold at the 2014 Asian Games and the 2016 Kabaddi World Cup. Ajay Thakur captained the side through the 2018 Asian Games before retiring from international play in late 2024. Deepak Niwas Hooda led the squad to gold at the 2022 Asian Games. Pawan Sehrawat, known as the "Hi-Flyer", captained India to the 2022 Asian Games gold (held in 2023) and the 2023 Asian Kabaddi Championship. For the 2026 Asian Games, the selectors named Sunil Kumar, the PKL's most successful captain by matches won, as captain, with Sehrawat as his deputy; India won gold.

=== All-time greats ===
- Rakesh Kumar – A versatile all-rounder from Haryana, he played a pivotal role in India's gold medal wins at the 2004 and 2007 Kabaddi World Cups and contributed to three Asian Games golds (2006, 2010, 2014). Received the Arjuna Award in 2011.
- Anup Kumar – Known as "Captain Cool", he contributed to gold medals at the 2010 and 2014 Asian Games and guided the team to the 2016 Kabaddi World Cup victory. Arjuna Award recipient (2012).
- Ajay Thakur – A prolific raider from Himachal Pradesh, he was instrumental in India's 2014 Asian Games gold and the 2016 Kabaddi World Cup victory. Received the Arjuna Award in 2019 and Padma Shri in 2019.
- Pardeep Narwal – Dubbed the "Dubki King" for his evasive raiding style, he contributed to gold medals at the 2014 Asian Games and 2016 Kabaddi World Cup, with over 50 international raid points in major tournaments.

=== Recent stars ===
- Pawan Sehrawat – Captained India to the 2022 Asian Games gold and the 2023 Asian Kabaddi Championship title, known for his explosive speed and do-or-die raids. Vice-captain of the 2026 Asian Games gold-medal team.
- Arjun Deshwal – One of India's premier raiders, topping Pro Kabaddi League raid points charts in multiple seasons and contributing to the 2023 Asian Kabaddi Championship triumph and the 2026 Asian Games gold.
- Naveen Kumar – Known for his relentless raiding, he was a headline performer at the 2022 Asian Games with do-or-die raids that helped India maintain an unbeaten run to gold, and was vice-captain of the side that won the 2026 Commonwealth Kabaddi Championship.
- Sunil Kumar – Tactical defensive anchor who served as vice-captain at the 2022 Asian Games, recording a tackle success rate above 70%, and captained India to gold at the 2026 Asian Games.
- Nitesh Kumar – Known for his super tackle expertise, earning acclaim for game-turning defensive plays in the 2022 Asian Games gold medal run.

=== Notable players ===
- Manathi Ganesan
- Aneesh Kumar S
- Maninder Singh
- Randhir Singh Sehrawat
- Ram Mehar Singh
- Balwan Singh
- Ramesh Kumar
- Rakesh Kumar
- Anup Kumar
- Navneet Gautam
- Jasvir Singh
- Ajay Thakur
- Rahul Chaudhari
- Manjeet Chhillar
- Mohit Chhillar
- Pardeep Narwal
- Dharmaraj Cheralathan
- Monu Goyat
- Rohit Kumar
- Rishank Devadiga
- Deepak Niwas Hooda
- Siddharth Desai
- Vikash Kandola
- Vishal Bharadwaj
- Sandeep Narwal
- Pawan Sehrawat
- Naveen Kumar
- Arjun Deshwal
- Sunil Kumar
- Nitesh Kumar

== See also ==
- India women's national kabaddi team
- Pro Kabaddi League
- Amateur Kabaddi Federation of India
- Kabaddi at the Asian Games
- 2026 Commonwealth Kabaddi Championship
