= 2017 Asian Kabaddi Championship =

- Venue: Iran Hall
- Dates: 22–26 November 2017
- Competitors: 235 from 10 nations

Champions
- Men: India
- Women: India

The 10th Edition of Asian Kabaddi Championship was held at Gorgan, Iran from 22 November to 26 November 2017. India continued their dominance winning both men's and women's tournament.

== Tournament ==
This was overall the 10th edition (10th for men's and 5th for women's). 1st ever to be held(and to be held outside India) in Iran, 20 teams (11 countries) participated at the tournament. This was regarded as the best edition of Asian Kabaddi Championship. India continued their dominance by winning both men and women competitions.

== Draw ==
9 Countries(Afghanistan only in men's and Chinese Taipei only in women's) participated in both men's and women's team competitions. They were divided into 2 Pools of 5 teams each in both men and women competition.

=== Men ===
Pool A

- India
- Iraq
- Pakistan
- Japan
- Afghanistan

Pool B

- Iran
- South Korea
- Sri Lanka
- Thailand
- Turkmenistan

=== Women ===
Pool A

- India
- Thailand
- South Korea
- Chinese Taipei
- Turkmenistan

Pool B

- Iran
- Sri Lanka
- Japan
- Iraq
- Pakistan

== Medalists ==
| Event | Gold | Silver | Bronze |
|---|---|---|---|
| Men's team | India | Pakistan | Iran |
| Men's team | India | Pakistan | South Korea |
| Women's team | India | South Korea | Pakistan |
| Women's team | India | South Korea | Iran |

== Medal table ==
| Rank | Nation | Gold | Silver | Bronze | Total |
|---|---|---|---|---|---|
| 1 | India (IND) | 2 | 0 | 0 | 2 |
| 2 | Pakistan (PAK) | 0 | 1 | 1 | 2 |
| 2 | South Korea (KOR) | 0 | 1 | 1 | 2 |
| 4 | Iran (IRN) | 0 | 0 | 2 | 2 |
| Totals (4 entries) | | 2 | 2 | 4 | 8 |

== Controversies and criticism ==
=== Thailand head coach headscarf incident ===
the head coach of the Thailand women's kabaddi team was reportedly caught with a headscarf over his head in order to gain entry into one of the matches that the Iranian women's team was taking part in. Reports suggest that the coach entered the premises of the match and wore two different colours of headscarves in order to blend in with the other women around. The act has been strongly condemned by the local sports authority and the Iranian Federation, who considered it a gross violation of the rules of the host country. Laws in Iran are still very strong when it comes to men and women's sports competitions and no man is allowed entry into one of the matches that the women are a part of.

=== Indian players slam organizers for no broadcast ===
Many Indian stars after winning the tournament slammed the organizers for not broadcasting the tournament. "It is a sad thing that there was not telecast at all on TV," said Puneri Paltan star Deepak Niwas Hooda, "Such events should certainly be broadcasted. We really liked it when everyone across India watched us play in the Pro Kabaddi League and even we could also see ourselves on TV, The organizers authorities should have certainly made an arrangement to telecast the matches in India. It means a lot to us if we know people back home are seeing us play and it gives us an extra boost." he added. Indian Captain Ajay Thakur said "We got to know that there is no telecast of the tournament in India and that you (fans) are unable to watch the matches. It as a very sad thing that there is no coverage of the Championships and we were very disappointed when we got to know this fact. However, we are trying to make as many videos as possible and take pictures so that we can share them with you,"
