= Jalalabad, Fazilka =

Jalalabad
- City
- Location in Punjab, India
- Coordinates: 30.62°N 74.25°E
- Country: India
- State: Punjab
- District: Fazilka
- Founder: Nawab Quttabdin of Mamdot
- Elevation: 176 m (577 ft)

Population (2022)
  - Total: 172,000

Languages
  - Official: Punjabi, Hindi, English
- Time zone: UTC+5:30 (IST)
- Vehicle registration: PB-61

Jalalabad (officially known as Parshurampuri as of July 7, 2026) is a city and a municipal council, just outside of Fazilka city in Fazilka district in the Indian state of Punjab. It is just 11 km from the India-Pakistan border. Famous personalities from Jalalabad include Sukhbir Singh Badal, Shubman Gill and Dr. Rajinder Pal Singh.

== History ==
Mamdot Nawabi was created by Qutubuddin Khan in 1800s in the Fazilka district. He conquered Mamdot from the Rai of Raikot in 1800s. Jalalabad was founded by the Nawab of Mamdot as its capital. It is named after Nawab Jalaluddin Khan, son of Nawab Qutubuddin Khan, and is a very rich city in Punjab known for its vast industrial area.

== Geography ==
Jalalabad is a constituency in the Indian state of Punjab. The Fazilka district is one of six border districts in Punjab, out of the 23 overall districts of the state. In the Fazilka district, there are three tehsils: Jalalabad West, Fazilka, and Abohar. The Pakistani border is around 15 km from Jalalabad. Jalalabad has an average elevation of 176 metres (577 ft).

== Important places in Jalalabad ==
- Sports stadium

A multipurpose sports stadium was constructed at Jalalabad for the second edition of World Kabaddi Cup which was conducted in November 2011.

- Rice Mills

There are rice mills at the outskirt of the city which exports rice.

== Famous personalities ==
- There are multiple famous personalities associated with the area, such as Shubman Gill and Parav Kalra.
