= Dirba =

Dirba Dirba Dirba
- City
- Nickname: Dirba
- Location in Punjab, India Dirba (India)
- Coordinates: 30.07°N 75.98°E
- Country: India
- State: Punjab
- District: Sangrur
- Elevation: 236 m (774 ft)

Population (2011)
  - Total: 16,952
- Demonym: Dirbian

Languages
  - Official: Punjabi
- Time zone: UTC+5:30 (IST)
- PIN: 148035
- Telephone code: 01676
- Vehicle registration: PB-86

Dirba is a Sub-Division and a Nagar Panchayat located in Dirba tehsil in Sangrur district in the state of Punjab, India. It is located on higher place and was also known as Thadde wala and with time; the name changed to Dirba.

== Geography ==
Dirba is located at 30.07°N 75.98°E. It has an average elevation of 236 metres (774 feet). Dirba Assembly Constituency is represented by Harpal Singh Cheema who won election on an Aam Aadmi Party ticket. Most of the residents in Dirba rely on Agriculture directly or indirectly. Rice and Wheat are the only two crops which is grown in most farms. Farmers of Dirba and its nearby villages are shifting their focus to organic farming for providing better quality vegetables to consumers.

== Demographics ==
The table below shows the population of different religious groups in Dirba town, as of 2011 census.

Population by religious groups in Dirba town, 2011 census
Religion	Total	Female	Male
Sikh	10,007	4,656	5,351
Hindu	6,280	2,964	3,316
Muslim	644	311	333
Christian	8	5	3
Buddhist	2	0	2
Other religions	1	1	0
Not stated	10	4	6
Total	16,952	7,941	9,011

== Education ==
Education in area is major issue . Although the area is present with too many schools in its locality, but the locality lacks in having a major university or college. Facing the issue, one tends to visit nearby cities like Patiala or Sangrur for higher education.
