= Mansa, Punjab =

Mansa Mānsā (Punjabi)
- City
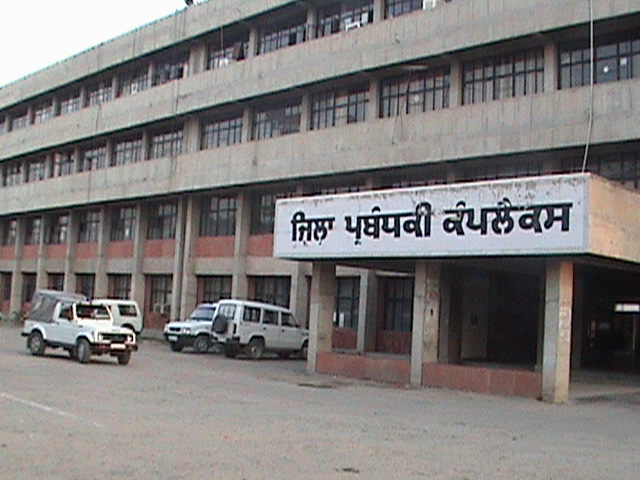
- District Administrative Complex, Mansa

- Location in Punjab, India Mansa (India)
- Coordinates: 29.9906°N 75.399648°E
- Country: India
- State: Punjab
- District: Mansa
- Elevation: 212 m (696 ft)

Population (2026)
  - Total: 125,000

Languages
  - Official: Punjabi, Hindi
- Time zone: UTC+5:30 (IST)
- PIN: 151505
- Telephone code: 01652
- Vehicle registration: PB-31

Mansa is a city of Punjab. It is the administrative headquarters of Mansa district and is situated on the Bathinda-Jind-Delhi railway line and also on the Jalandar -Barnala-Sirsa- Churu National Highway (NH 703), Bathinda - Bhikhi - Bhudlada- Jakhal National highway (NH 148B) and Mansa -Talwandi sabo road. Mansa district is located in the southernmost part of the state.

The population is Punjabi-speaking and associated with the Malwa culture of Punjab. Mansa is situated in the cotton belt of Punjab. Indeed, agriculture forms the backbone of the district economy. During the months of November and December a visitor to this part of Punjab may witness the cotton blooming in the Mansa fields. The city has a temple of Baba Bhai Gurdas Ji in the southeast of the town; a fair is held during the March–April season at the temple.

== Geography ==
Mansa is located at 29.98°N 75.38°E. It has an average elevation of 212 metres (695 feet). also the roads are up to date for the time

== History ==
The ancient history of the Mansa district has been traced to the Indus Valley civilization. The archaeological findings at different villages of Mansa district are almost similar to those of Harappa and Mohanjodaro. The Rakhigarhi, the biggest Indus Valley Civilization town, is very near to Mansa. Mansa was formerly a part of Phulkian Sikh Dynasty (1722–1948) then part of Kaithal Sikh Kingdom (1762–1857).

The city is said to have been founded by Bhai Gurdas who hailed from Dhingar, Mansa district. He is said to have been married at this place among the Dhaliwal Jat Sikh. Once he came to his in-laws to take his wife along with him but they refused to send her. At this, Bhai Gurdas sat in meditation before the house of his in-laws. After some time, the parents of the girl agreed to send their daughter with Bhai Gurdas.

But he refused to take her along with him, stating that he had now renounced the worldly way of life. In his memory, his Smadh was constructed where a fair is held every year in March–April. People in large numbers attend the fair and offer Laddus and Gur (Jaggery) at Smadh. Class ‘A’ Municipality has been functioning in the town since 1952.

== Education ==
Mansa is a city with the lowest education metrics in the state, although the students of this town have done well in medical/engineering areas. The students have excelled in state exams as well as the country's top institutions.

The town has three colleges, viz. Nehru Memorial Government College, Mata Sundri Girls College and S.D. Kanya Mahavidyala College. The past few years have seen some changes in the field of education but more developments need to be done for growth of the city.

== Transport ==
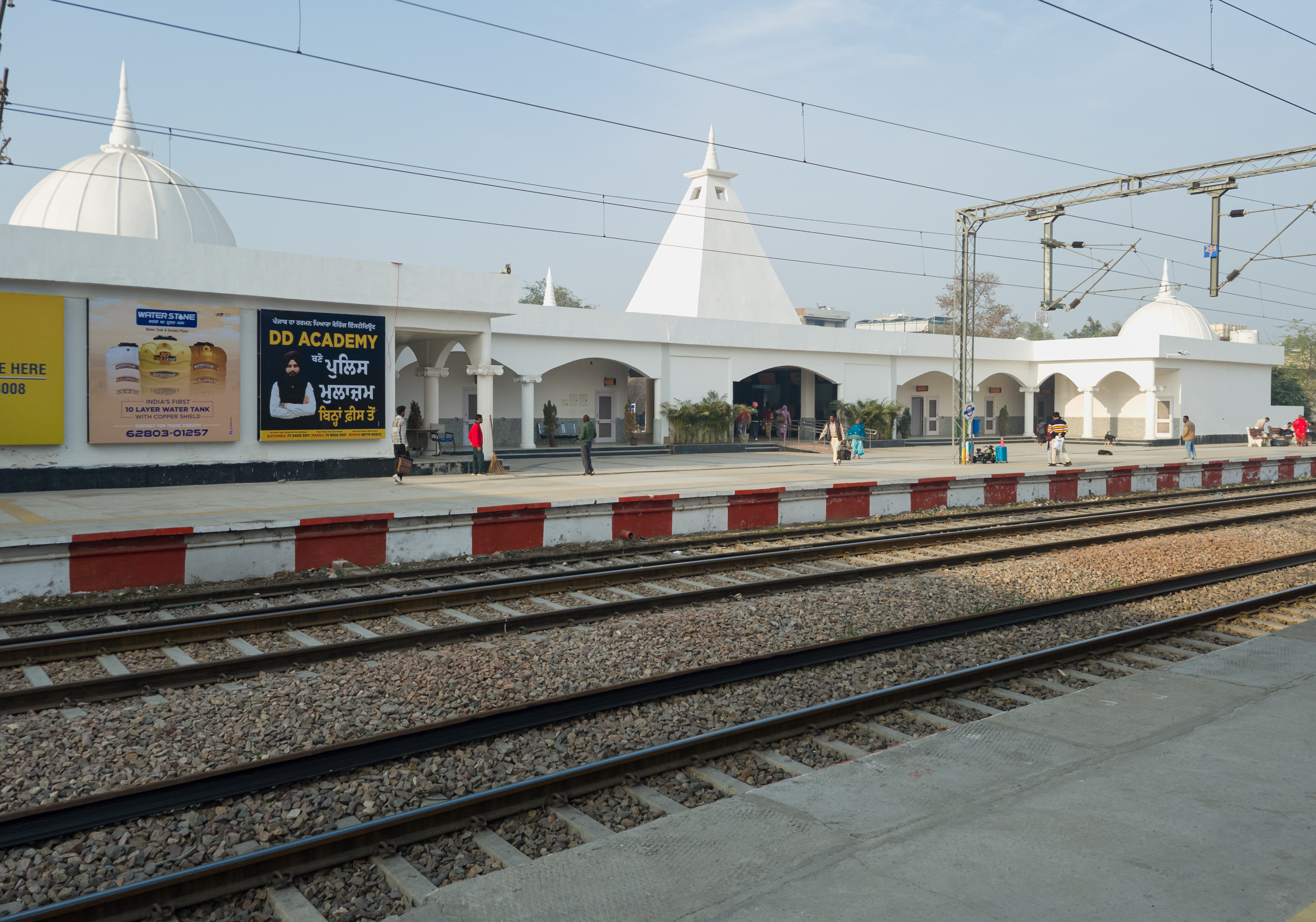
Railway Station, Mansa.

Mansa is well connected to major cities in northern India through an established network of rail and road transport. It maintains regular links with the national capital, New Delhi, facilitating passenger and goods movement. The nearest airports are located at New Delhi (approximately 248 km by road) and Chandigarh (approximately 180 km by road). In addition, new airport facilities are expected to become operational in Ludhiana and Bathinda, which may further improve regional connectivity.

The town is connected by rail and lies on the Delhi–Bathinda branch line of the Northern Railway. Mansa railway station is served by several long-distance and intercity trains, including the New Delhi–Bathinda Intercity Express, Ferozepur–Mumbai Janta Express, Avadh Assam Express, and Punjab Mail. These services provide connections to multiple regions across the country. In addition to express services, passenger trains operate at regular intervals between Mansa and New Delhi, supporting daily travel needs. Mansa is linked to nearby towns and major urban centres across Punjab through a network of state and private bus services. These routes enable regular and accessible transportation for residents, contributing to regional mobility and economic activity.

== Demographics ==
As of the 2011 census, Mansa had a population of 82,956. Mansa has an average literacy rate of 85%: male literacy is 90%, and female literacy is 80%. In Mansa, 11.02% of the population is under 6 years of age.

The table below shows the population of different religious groups in Mansa city, as of the 2011 census.

Population by religious groups in Mansa city, 2011 census
Religion	Total	Female	Male
Hindu	45,494	21,331	24,163
Sikh	35,604	16,697	18,907
Muslim	1,168	535	633
Jain	204	88	116
Christian	91	45	46
Buddhist	72	37	35
Other religions	39	15	24
Not stated	284	119	165
Total	82,956	38,867	44,089

== Sports ==
There is a cricket academy which provides coaching facilities for young cricketers and a Kabaddi stadium where International Kabaddi Cup was contested.

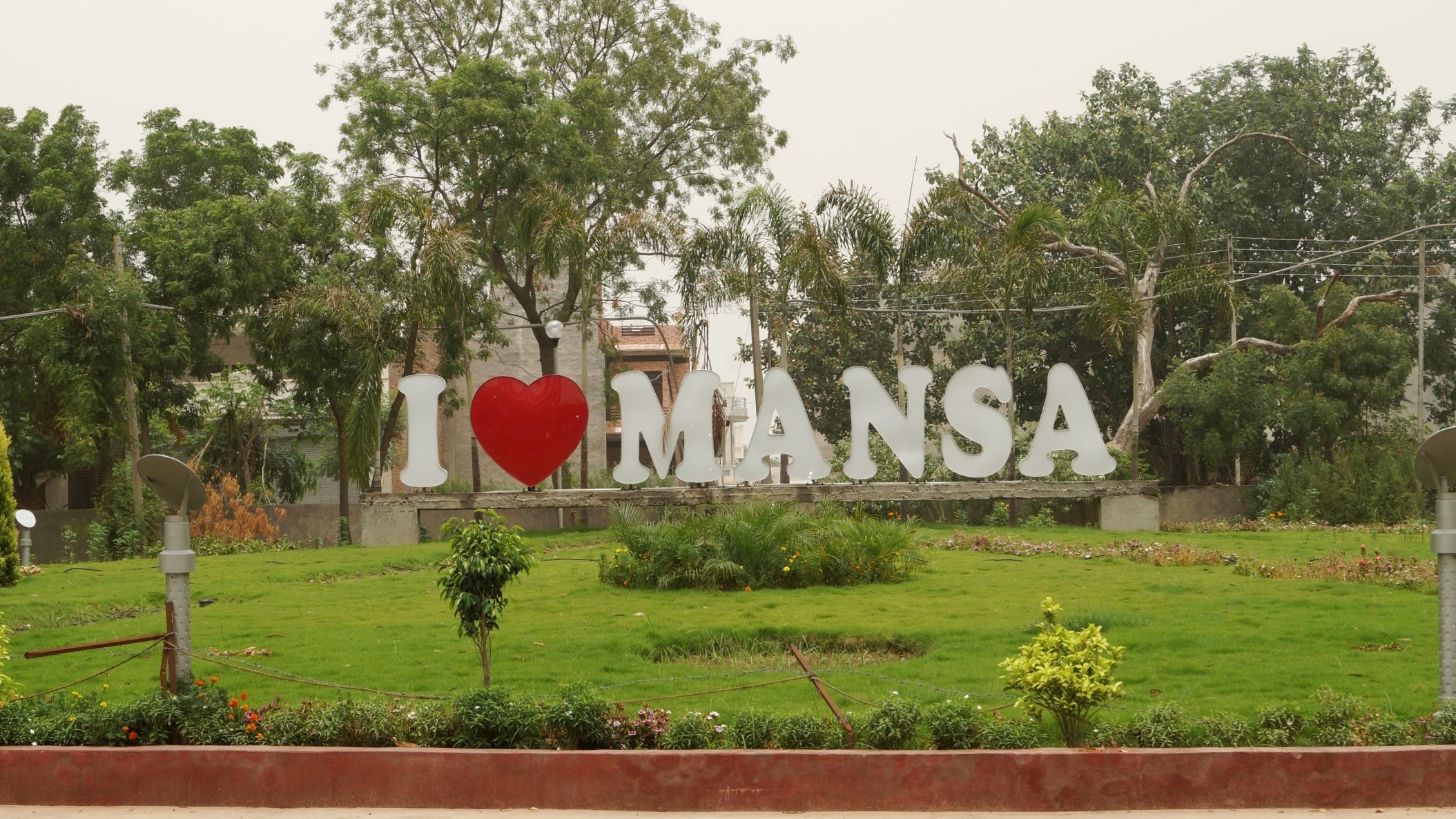
The Central Park Mansa

== Notable people ==
- Harbhajan Singh Manshahia, Former Cabinet Minister (Excise and Taxation) under Lachhman Singh Gill
- Dr. Mukhdeep Singh Manshahia, Indian computer scientist in artificial intelligence, assistant professor at Punjabi University
- Ajmer Singh Aulakh, Indian writer in Punjabi
- Aman Dhaliwal, Indian model and actor
- Deep Dhillon, Indian singer and actor
- Gavie Chahal, Indian actor of film and television
- Kulwinder Billa, Indian singer and actor
- Nirmal Rishi, Indian actress
- Sawarn Singh, Indian rower Olympian, Arjuna Award winner, Maharaj Ranjit Singh State Award winner in Rowing Asian Games 2018 Gold medalist from the village of Dalelwala
- Shipra Goyal, Indian singer
- Sidhu Moose Wala, Indian singer, lyricist and actor
- Sukhmeet Singh, Indian rower, Asian Games 2018 gold medalist, from the village of Kishangarh Pharwahi
- Vijay Singla, Indian politician, member of Aam Aadmi Party
