= Asian Kabaddi Championship =

Kabaddi tournament

- Sport: Standard style kabaddi
- Founded: 1980; 46 years ago
- First season: M: 1980; W: 2005
- Most recent season: M: 2023; W: 2025
- Administrator: Asian Kabaddi Federation
- No. of teams: 10
- Region: Asia
- Most recent champions: M: India (8th title); W: India (5th title)
- Most titles: M: India (8 titles); W: India (5 titles)

Asian Kabaddi Championship is a standard style Kabaddi tournament. It was first held in 1980. The 9th tournament was held in Republic of Korea and won by India and secured its 8th medal.

== Men ==
Year	Host	Gold	Silver	Bronze	Ref
1980	Kolkata, India	India	Bangladesh	Nepal	
1988	Jaipur, India	India	Bangladesh		
2000	Colombo, Sri Lanka	India	Sri Lanka	Pakistan	
2001	Bangkok, Thailand	India	Thailand		
2002	Kuala Lumpur, Malaysia	India	Japan	Iran	
2003	Kangar, Malaysia	Iran	Malaysia	Sri Lanka	
2005	Tehran, Iran	India	Pakistan	Iran	
2017	Gorgan, Iran	India	Pakistan	Iran; South Korea	
2023	Busan, South Korea	India	Iran	Chinese Taipei	

== Women ==
Year	Host	Gold	Silver	Bronze	Ref
2005	Hyderabad, India	India	Japan	Sri Lanka; Bangladesh	
2007	Tehran, Iran	India	Iran	Sri Lanka; Thailand	
2008	Madurai, India	India	Iran	Japan; Thailand	
2016	Busan, South Korea	South Korea	Thailand	Iran; Sri Lanka	
2017	Gorgan, Iran	India	South Korea	Iran; Sri Lanka	
2025	Tehran, Iran	India	Iran	Nepal; Bangladesh	

== Performance by nations ==
=== Men ===
Rank	Nation	Gold	Silver	Bronze	Total
1	India	8	0	0	8
2	Iran	1	1	2	4
3	Pakistan	0	2	1	3
4	Bangladesh	0	2	0	2
5	Sri Lanka	0	1	1	2
6	Japan	0	1	0	1
6	Malaysia	0	1	0	1
8	Chinese Taipei	0	0	1	1
8	Nepal	0	0	1	1
8	South Korea	0	0	1	1
Totals (10 entries)		9	8	7	24

=== Women ===
Rank	yes	Gold	Silver	Bronze	Total
1	India	5	0	0	5
2	South Korea	1	1	0	2
3	Iran	0	3	2	5
4	Thailand	0	1	2	3
5	Japan	0	1	1	2
6	Sri Lanka	0	0	4	4
7	Bangladesh	0	0	2	2
8	Nepal	0	0	1	1
Totals (8 entries)		6	6	12	24
