= Chohla Sahib =

Chohla Sahib Chola Sahib
- Town
- Location in Punjab, India
- Coordinates: 31°15′25″N 74°59′38″E
- Country: India
- State: Punjab
- District: Tarn Taran
- Region of Punjab: Majha

Area
  - Total: 17.82 km^{2} (6.88 sq mi)

Population (2011)
  - Total: 11,561
  - Density: 648.8/km^{2} (1,680/sq mi)

Languages
  - Official: Punjabi
- Time zone: UTC+5:30 (IST)
- PIN: 143408
- Vehicle registration: PB-46

Chohla Sahib is a town and a nagar panchayat in Tarn Taran district of the Majha region of Indian state of Punjab. This town is located in Chohla Sahib development block. Chohla Sahib is a historical place in view of two sikh gurus having visited this place. The postal index number of Chohla Sahib is 143408.

== Demographics ==
As per 2011 Census of India, Chohla Sahib had 2115 number of households and total population was 11,561 persons. There were total of 6,097 males, 5,464 females in 2011 in this town. The total number of children of 6 years or below were 1,334 in town. The percentage of male population was 52.74%, the percentage of female population was 47.26% and the percentage of child population was 11.54%. Average Sex Ratio of Chohla Sahib was 896 which is higher than Punjab state average of 895.

=== Literacy ===
In 2011, literacy rate of Chohla Sahib was 70.71 % compared to 75.84 % of Punjab, male literacy was 75.64 % and female literacy rate was 65.27 %.
