= Guru Gobind Singh Stadium =

Multi purpose stadium in India

Coordinates: 31°18′47″N 75°34′53″E

Guru Gobind Singh Stadium ਗੁਰੂ ਗੋਬਿੰਦ ਸਿੰਘ ਸਟੇਡੀਅਮ
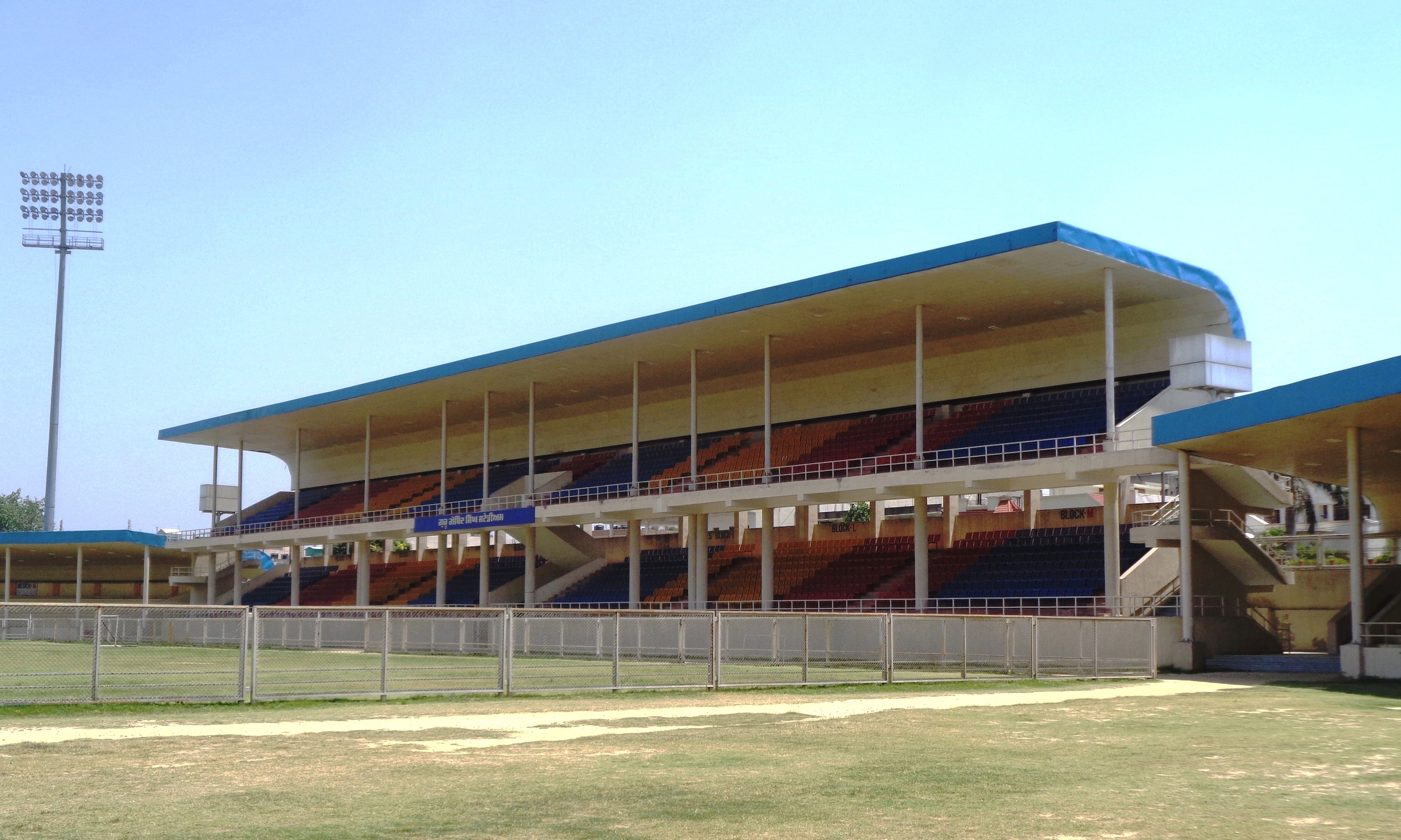
- Guru Gobind Singh Stadium
- Interactive map of Guru Gobind Singh Stadium ਗੁਰੂ ਗੋਬਿੰਦ ਸਿੰਘ ਸਟੇਡੀਅਮ
- Location: Jalandhar, India
- Owner: Punjab Football Association
- Capacity: 22,000
- Surface: Bermuda Grass

Construction
- Opened: 1971

Tenants
- Punjab State Super Football League; Punjab Women's League

Guru Gobind Singh Stadium is a multi-purpose stadium in Jalandhar, in the Indian Punjab state. It is currently used for football matches. The stadium holds 22,000 people.

== History ==
The stadium is used by the locals of Jalandhar city most of time for the purpose of staying fit. People can be seen jogging, playing football, weight-lifting, etc. in the stadium most of the time. It opens at 5:00 a.m. and closes at 10:00 p.m. Events like kabaddi, live music shows, award ceremonies etc. are organized at this stadium as well.

The stadium has been installed with floodlights to allow people to enjoy the facilities of the stadium even at night. The stadium has an average sized parking lot on each side for the people coming to it.

== Facilities ==
- Fully equipped Floodlights
- Dressing rooms, Referees’ Changing Rooms, Administration Rooms
- VIP/Guest Lounge
- Media Room with facilities for print, radio, live TV broadcast etc.,
- Conference & meeting room
- Medical room
- Spectator facilities
- Adequate area/space for Vehicle parking
