= Kumar =

South Asian name

Kumar (Sanskrit: कुमार, romanized: kumārá) is a title, given name, middle name, or a family name found in the Indian subcontinent, mainly in, but not limited to, India, Bangladesh, Pakistan, Sri Lanka, and Nepal, though not specific to any religion, ethnicity, or caste. It is a generic title which variously means prince, son, boy, or chaste. It is the 11th most common family name in the world as of August 2019.

== Geographical distribution ==
As of 2014, 97.3% of all known bearers of the surname Kumar were residents of India. The frequency of the surname was higher than national average in the following states and union territories:

- 1. Himachal Pradesh (1: 9)
- 2. Chandigarh (1: 10)
- 3. Delhi (1: 11)
- 3. Haryana (1: 11)
- 4. Bihar (1: 15)
- 5. Jammu and Kashmir (1: 16)
- 5. Uttar Pradesh (1: 16)
- 6. Uttarakhand (1: 28)
- 7. Rajasthan (1: 30)
- 8. Punjab (1: 39)

== Notable people ==
=== First name ===
- Kumar Basnet, (born 1943) Nepalese folk singer
- Kumar Dharmasena, Sri Lankan cricketer and International cricket umpire
- Kumar Gandharva (1924–1992), Indian singer
- Kumar Gaurav, Indian film actor
- Kumar Kashyap Mahasthavir, Nepalese Buddhist monk
- Kumar Malavalli, Indian businessman
- Kumar Mangalam Birla, Indian industrialist
- Kumar Pallana, Indian film actor
- Kumar Ponnambalam (1940–2000), Sri Lankan lawyer and politician
- Kumar Pradhan, Nepalese scholar
- Kumar Ram Narain Karthikeyan, Indian racing car driver
- Kumar Rocker, American baseball pitcher
- Kumar Sangakkara, Sri Lankan cricketer and a former captain of the Sri Lanka national cricket team
- Kumar Sanu, Indian playback singer
- Kumar Shahani (1940–2024), Indian film director
- Kumar Shri Duleepsinhji, cricketer who played for England
- Kumar Shri Ranjitsinhji, aka K. S. Ranjitsinhji, Indian prince, maharaja and Test cricketer
- Kumar Vishwas, Hindi-language performance poet

=== Middle name ===
- Abhas Kumar Ganguly, birth name of Kishore Kumar
- Adarsh Kumar Goel, Indian judge
- Ajith Kumar Siriwardena, Sri Lankan Briton professor of hepato-pancreatico-biliary surgery
- Akshay Kumar Datta, Bengali writer
- Amal Kumar Raychaudhuri, a leading physicist
- Amrit Kumar Bohara, Nepalese politician
- Anant Kumar Agarwal, engineer
- Ananth Kumar Hegde, Indian politician
- Anil Kumar Jha, (born 1969) Nepalese politician
- Anjani Kumar Sharma, Nepalese surgeon
- Arjun Kumar Basnet, (born 1975) Nepalese marathon runner
- General Arunkumar Vaidya, the former Chief of Indian Army
- Arup Kumar Kundu, educationist, rheumatologist, clinician, orator, teacher, and author
- Bijay Kumar Gachchhadar, Nepalese politician
- Devendra Kumar Joshi, the Indian Chief of Naval Staff
- Dinesh Kumar Tripathi, serving four star flag officer of the Indian Navy.
- Hemanta Kumar Mukhopadhyay, a Bengali singer, composer and producer
- Inder Kumar Gujral, an Indian politician who served as the 12th Prime Minister of India
- Keshav Kumar Budhathoki, Nepali politician
- Madhav Kumar Nepal, Former Prime Minister of Nepal
- Manoj Kumar Katiyar, general officer of the Indian Army
- Manoj Kumar Pandey, Indian Army officer, recipient of the Param Vir Chakra
- Manoj Kumar Sharma, Indian Police Service (IPS) officer
- Nirmal Kumar Verma, former senior naval officer
- Pawan Kumar Chamling, an Sikkimese politician who served as the 5th Chief Minister of Sikkim
- Pradip Kumar Rai known as Byakul Maila, Nepalese poet
- Prafulla Kumar Mahanta, Indian politician who was the leader of the Assam Movement, a former Chief Minister of Assam
- Prem Kumar Dhumal, chief minister of Indian state
- Raj Kumar Saini, Indian politician
- Raj Kumar Rao, Indian actor
- Raj Kumar Kapoor, Indian actor, director
- Rakesh Kumar Singh Bhadauria, retired Indian Air Force officer, who served as the Chief of the Air Staff of the Indian Air Force
- Ravi Kumar Dahiya, Indian freestyle wrestler
- Ravi Kumar Dhingra, serving Flag officer in the Indian Navy
- Roop Kumar Rathod, an Indian playback singer and music director
- Sanjeev Kumar Yadav, DANIPS officer.
- Santosh Kumar Ghosh, Bengali writer and journalist
- Santosh Kumar Gupta, former Indian Navy admiral, recipient of Maha Vir Chakra
- Satinder Kumar Saini, vice chief of the Indian army
- Selvar Kumar Silvaras (c. 1971–1998), Singaporean convicted murderer
- Shailendra Kumar Upadhyaya, Nepalese diplomat
- Shiv Kumar Batalvi, a Punjabi language poet
- Siddharth Kumar Tewary, Indian television producer and director
- Srinivas Kumar Sinha, Indian military officer
- Sunil Kumar Yadav, Nepalese politician
- Suniti Kumar Chatterji, an Indian linguist, educationist and litterateur
- Sushil Kumar Modi, is an Indian politician
- Tapan Kumar Pradhan, Indian bank, activist and poet
- Tej Kumar Shrestha, Nepalese zoologist
- Vijay Kumar Malhotra, Indian politician
- Vijay Kumar Pandey, Nepalese journalist
- Vijay Kumar Singh, Indian politician and a retired four star general in the Indian Army
- Vijay Kumar Yadav, Indian judoka
- Vineet Kumar Chaudhary, Indian television actor
- Vineet Kumar Singh, Indian film actor
- Vinod Kumar Shukla, modern Hindi writer
- Vinod Kumar Yadav, Former chairperson of the Railway Board, first chief executive officer, Railway Board, Indian Railways
- Yashvardhan Kumar Sinha, retired Indian diplomat
- Yogesh Kumar Joshi, 17th and the current Commander, XIV Corps of the Indian Army
- Yogesh Kumar Sabharwal, the 36th Chief Justice of India

=== Last name ===
- Ajith Kumar, an Indian actor who works mainly in Tamil cinema
- Akhil Kumar, an Indian boxer who has won several international and national boxing awards
- Akshay Kumar, stage name of Indian-Canadian film actor, producer and martial artist, Rajiv Bhatia
- Amit Kumar, Indian film playback singer, actor, and director
- Amitava Kumar, Indian writer, journalist, professor
- Anand Kumar, Indian mathematician
- Anil Kumar, Indian businessman, consultant
- Anup Kumar, Indian film actor
- Ashok Kumar, AKA Dadamoni in Bengali, Indian film actor
- Ashok Kumar (Jammu and Kashmir politician), Member of the Jammu and Kashmir Legislative Assembly
- Arun Kumar, Indian politician Bandi Sanjay Kumar, Indian politician
- Bhushan Kumar, chairman and managing director of T-Series
- Bhuvneshwar Kumar, Indian pace bowler
- Chetan Kumar, Indian actor
- Darshan Kumar, Indian actor
- Deepak Kumar, several people, including:
  - Deepak Kumar (historian), Indian historian
  - Deepak Kumar (physicist), Indian condensed matter physicist and professor
  - Deepak Kumar (sport shooter), Indian sport shooter
- Dev Kumar, Indian actor
- Digendra Kumar, Indian military officer
- Dilip Kumar, Indian film actor known as the 'Tragedy King' and a former Member of Parliament
- Dinesh Kumar (basketball), Indian professional basketball player
- Divya Khosla Kumar, Indian film actress, producer and director
- E. Santhosh Kumar, Indian writer
- Girish Kumar, Indian film actor
- G. V. Prakash Kumar, Indian film score and soundtrack composer and singer
- Gulshan Kumar, T-Series music label owner
- Guru Rudra Kumar
- Havildar Anuj Kumar, Indian professional bodybuilder
- Himanshu Kumar, Indian activist
- Hiten Kumar, Gujarati film actor
- Inder Kumar, Indian actor
- Indra Kumar, an Indian film director and producer
- Jainendra Kumar (1905–1988), Indian writer
- Jeeva Kumar, Indian kabaddi player
- Jitender Kumar (flyweight boxer), an Indian flyweight boxer
- Jitendra Kumar, Indian film actor
- Kanhaiya Kumar, Indian politician
- Kishore Kumar, Indian film playback singer, actor, lyricist, composer, producer, director, screenwriter and scriptwriter
- Mala Kumar, Indian American novelist, LGBTQ activist and technologist
- Manoj Kumar (disambiguation), several people, including:
  - Manoj Kumar (boxer), Indian boxer who won a gold medal in the light welterweight division at the 2010 Commonwealth Games
  - Manoj Kumar, an award-winning Indian actor and director in the Bollywood
- María Teresa Kumar, a political organizer and voting rights activist for Latinos in the United States
- Meira Kumar, an Indian politician and a five time Member of Parliament
- Mukesh Kumar, several people, including:
  - Mukesh Kumar (cricketer), Indian cricketer
  - Mukesh Kumar (field hockey), Indian field hockey player
  - Mukesh Kumar (golfer), Indian golfer
- Mukul Kumar, Indian civil servant and writer
- Navin Kumar
- Navleen Kumar, Indian human rights activist
- Nirmalya Kumar, professor and businessman
- Niru Kumar, Indian social activist
- Nish Kumar, British comedian
- Nitish Kumar, Indian politician who served as the 22nd Chief Minister of Bihar
- Oil Kumar, aa Indian ganglord and organized crime boss
- Pawan Kumar, several people, including:
  - Pawan Kumar (director), Indian film director, actor, producer, and screenwriter
  - Pawan Kumar (wrestler), Indian wrestler
- Pradeep Kumar (actor), Indian actor in Hindi, Bengali and English-language films
- Praveen Kumar (cricketer), Indian medium-pace swing bowler
- Prem Kumar, several people, including:
  - Prem Kumar (footballer) (born 1989), Indian footballer
  - Prem Kumar (Malayalam actor), Indian film actor in Malayalam films
  - Prem Kumar (Tamil actor), Indian film actor in Tamil films
- R Sri Kumar (born 1949), Indian vigilance commissioner
- Raaj Kumar, Indian film actor
- Rajendra Kumar, Indian film actor
- Ratan Kumar, Film actor
- Ravi Kumar (Indian footballer)
- Ravish Kumar, Indian Journalist at NDTV India
- Ritu Kumar, Indian fashion designer
- Rohit Kumar, several people, including:
  - Rohit Kumar (footballer), Indian professional footballer
  - Rohit Kumar (kabaddi), Indian professional Kabaddi player
  - Rohit Kumar (rower), Indian professional rower
- Sai Kumar, Malayalam actor
- Sanjay Kumar, several people, including:
  - Sanjay Kumar (business executive), former CEO of Computer Associates
  - Sanjay Kumar (soldier), Indian Army soldier who received the Param Vir Chakra
- Sanjeev Kumar, Indian film actor
- Satish Kumar (pastor), Indian pastor
- Saurabh Kumar (engineer), Indian engineer
- Shashi Kumar, or Shashikumar, Indian actor and politician
- Simita Kumar, Scottish politician
- Srini Kumar
- Sushil Kumar, several people, including:
  - Sushil Kumar (wrestler), Indian World Champion wrestler
- Tulsi Kumar, an Indian playback singer for Bollywood films
- Udai Kumar
- Udaya Kumar (director), Kannada film director
- Uttam Kumar, Indian (Bengali) cinema actor and contemporary of Dilip Kumar
- Uttar Kumar, famous actor in north India
- Varun Kumar (journalist), Indian journalist
- Venkatesh Kumar, Hindustani vocalist
- Vikram Kumar, Indian film director and screenwriter
- Vijay Kumar (sport shooter), Indian champion shooter, Olympic 2012 silver medalist
- Vimal Kumar, Indian badminton player
- Vinay Kumar, Indian cricket player
- Vinay Kumar (pathologist), the Alice Hogge & Arthur Baer Professor of Pathology at the University of Chicago
- Vinay Kumar (academician)
- Vinoth Kumar, Indian football player
- Vishwa Mohan Kumar (born 1958), Indian politician
- Yuva Kumar

== See also ==
- Kumarbi
- Keyumars
- Yuvraj (disambiguation)
- Arunkumar
