= Vinay Kumar (disambiguation) =

Vinay Kumar is an Indian cricketer and cricket commentator.

Vinay Kumar may also refer to:

- Vinay Kumar (pathologist), Indian pathologist in the U.S.
- Vinay Kumar (politician), Indian politician
- Vinay Kumar (academician), vice-chancellor of Chaudhary Charan Singh Haryana Agricultural University
- Vinay Kumar Jha, Nepalese cricket umpire
- Vinay Kumar (diplomat), Ambassador of India to Russia
