= Pro Kabaddi League: Melbourne Raid =

2024 sporting event in Australia

Pro Kabaddi League Melbourne Raid
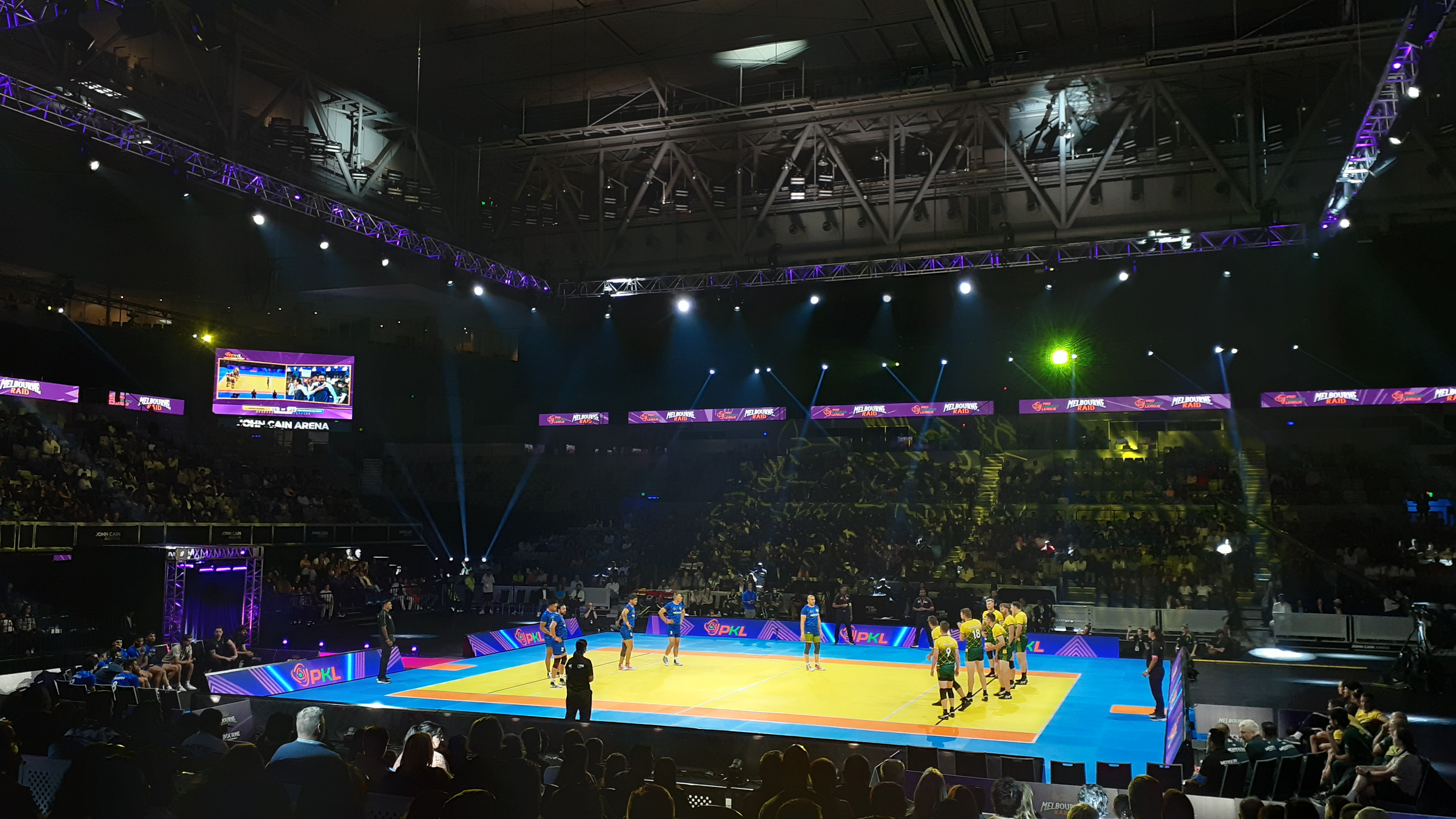
- John Cain Arena during the Pro Kabaddi League: Melbourne Raid Event - 28 December 2024

Tournament information
- Date: 28 December 2024
- Administrator: Mashal Sports
- Host(s): Melbourne, Australia
- Venue: John Cain Arena
- Teams: 4
- Broadcast: India: Star Sports 2; Star Sports 1 Hindi; Star Sports 1 Tamil; Star Sports 1 Telugu; Star Sports 1 Kannada; Disney+ Hotstar (online streaming); Australia: 7plus
- Website: Pro Kabaddi

Tournament statistics
- Matches played: 2

The Pro Kabaddi League: Melbourne Raid was an event hosted by the Pro Kabaddi League in association with the Victoria State Government that featured two Kabaddi exhibition matches. The Event was held on 28 December 2024 at the John Cain Arena in Melbourne, Victoria, Australia. The Event featured two Kabaddi All Star matches, with the first match being against the PKL All Star Mavericks and the PKL All Star Masters, and the second match being against the Pro Kabaddi All Stars and the Aussie Raiders. The Event was announced on 11 November 2024, after Premier of Victoria Jacinta Allan visited India with the promise of bringing a Pro Kabaddi event to Melbourne.

== History ==
On 18 September 2024, the premier of Victoria Jacinta Allan released a press statement saying that she will be working with Head of Sports at Disney Star Sanjog Gupta and League Commissioner of PKL Anupam Goswami to bring a Pro Kabaddi League Showcase to Melbourne, Victoria, Australia in the next 18 Months. On 11 November 2024, Jacinta Allan held a press conference at John Cain Arena to announce that a Pro Kabaddi League showcase event called "Melbourne Raid" will be held at the arena on 28 December 2024, following Day 3 of the Boxing Day Test Cricket Match at the Melbourne Cricket Ground between Australia and India. Tickets went on sale via Ticketmaster on 12 November 2024.

On 24 December 2024, Pro Kabaddi League announced the squads for the four teams that would be competing at the Melbourne Raid Event. Match 1 would be contested by two PKL All Star Teams named as the Mavericks and Masters, while Match 2 would be contested between a Pro Kabaddi All Stars team and the Aussie Raiders, with the Aussie Raiders consisting of former AFL Players.

== Venue ==
The Event was held at the John Cain Arena in Melbourne, Victoria, Australia.

Australia
Melbourne
John Cain Arena
Capacity: 10,300
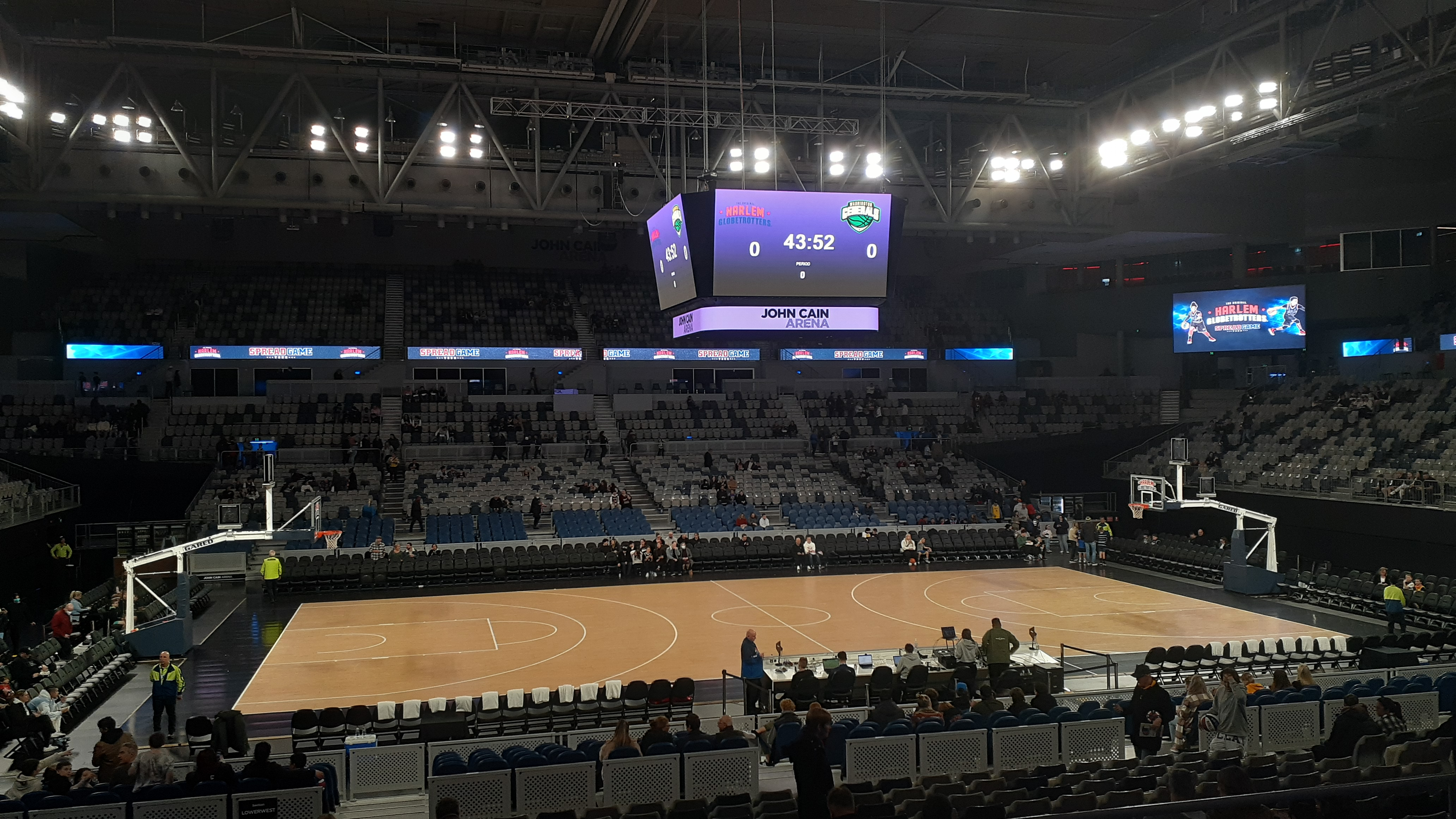

== Broadcast ==
The two matches were broadcast on Star Sports 1 Hindi, Star Sports 1 Hindi HD, Star Sports First and Sports18 Khel on Television in India, as well as being streamed live on the Disney+ Hotstar app and website. In Australia, the two matches were livestreamed on 7plus for free.

== Teams ==
Team	Color
PKL All Star Mavericks	
PKL All Star Masters	
Pro Kabaddi All Stars	
Aussie Raiders	

PKL All Star Mavericks

Name	Position
Ajay Thakur (captain)	Raider
Deepak Hooda	Raider
Aadesh	Raider
Rakesh	Raider
Pardeep Narwal	Raider
Nitin Rawal	Left Corner & Raider
Aditya Powar	Left Corner
Nitesh Kumar	Right Corner
Mayur Kadam	Right Cover
Priyank Chandel	Left Cover
Nitin	Left Corner
Sachin	Raider
E. Bhaskaran	Coach
Source: SportStar

PKL All Star Masters

Name	Position
Rakesh Kumar (captain)	Raider
Anup Kumar	Raider
Sukesh Hegde	Raider
Jai Bhagwan	Raider
Maninder Singh	Raider
Jeeva Kumar	Left Cover
Sandeep Narwal	Right Cover
Vishal Bhardwaj	Left Corner
Saurabh Nandal	Right Corner
Mohit	Right Cover
Ran Singh	Right & Left Corner
Nitesh	Left Corner
B.C. Ramesh	Coach
Source: SportStar

Pro Kabaddi All Stars

Name	Position
Anup Kumar (captain)	Raider
Rakesh Kumar	Raider
Sukesh Hegde	Raider
Jai Bhagwan	Raider
Pardeep Narwal	Raider
Maninder Singh	Raider
Jeeva Kumar	Left Cover
Sandeep Narwal	Right Cover
Vishal Bhardwaj	Left Corner
Saurabh Nandal	Right Corner
Mohit	Right Cover
Nitesh	Left Corner
E. Bhaskaran	Coach
Source: SportStar

Aussie Raiders

Name	Position
Josh Kennedy (captain)	Left In & Raider
Marc Murphy	Corner & Raider
Dan Hannebery	Left Corner
Brett Deledio	Raider
Ben Nugent	Centre & Raider
Billy Gowers	Left Corner & Raider
Michael Hibberd	Left Corner
Trent McKenzie	Right In
Dyson Heppell	Left Corner & Raider
Liam Shiels	Right Corner & Raider
Campbell Brown	Coach
Source: SportStar

== Matches ==
Match 1
28 December 2024
20:00 (AEDT), 14:30 (IST)

PKL All Star Mavericks	41 - 39	PKL All Star Masters

PKL All Star Mavericks defeat PKL All Star Masters

Match 2
28 December 2024
21:10 (AEDT), 15:40 (IST)

Pro Kabaddi All Stars	46 - 28	Aussie Raiders

Pro Kabaddi All Stars defeat Aussie Raiders
