= Sušil =

Sušil may refer to:

- František Sušil (1804, Rousínov - 1868, Bystřice pod Hostýnem), a Moravian Roman Catholic priest
- 21229 Sušil, a main belt asteroid

== See also ==
- Susil Moonesinghe, a Sri Lankan lawyer, politician and diplomat
- Susil Fernando
- Susil Premajayanth
- Sushil
