= Sushil =

Sushil is a first name in Hindu and Buddhist communities. The feminine form is (Sushila). An alternate spelling used is Susheel.

== People with first name "Sushil/Sushila" ==
- Sushila Adivarekar (1923–2012), Indian politician
- Sushil Atreya, planetary scientist, educator and researcher
- Sushil Barman, Indian politician
- Sushil Barongpa (born 1947), Indian politician
- Sushil Bhattacharya (1924–2015), Indian football player and coach
- Sushil Biswas (1955–2014), Indian politician
- Sushil Bose (1911–1989), Indian cricketer
- Sushila Chain Trehan (1923–2011), Indian freedom fighter and women's rights activist
- Sushil Chandra (born 1957), Indian politician
- Sushil Chandra Varma (1926–2011), Indian politician
- Sushila Chanu (born 1992), Indian field hockey player
- Sushila Chaudhary, Nepalese politician
- Sushil Chhetri, Nepalese actor
- Sushil Datta (born 1959), Indian filmmaker, writer and teacher
- Shushila Devi Likmabam (born 1995), Indian judoka
- Sushila Didi (1905–1963), Indian revolutionary
- Sushil Doshi, Indian journalist, writer and sports commentator
- Sushil Dutta, Indian politician
- Sushila Ganesh Mavalankar (1904–1995), Indian freedom fighter
- Sushil Gupta (born 1961), Indian politician and businessman
- Sushila Hazarika, Indian politician
- Sushil Jajodia, computer scientist
- Sushil Kanwar, Indian politician
- Sushil Kapoor (born 1939), Indian cricketer
- Sushila Karki (born 1952), Nepalese jurist
- Sushila Kerketta (1939–2009), Indian politician
- Sushil Kohli (born 1953), Indian swimmer and water polo player
- Sushila Koirala (1923–2007), Nepalese classical dancer and theater director
- Sushil Koirala (1931–2016), Nepalese politician
- Sushil Kumar (disambiguation), multiple people
- Sushil Kumar Bhattacharya (1921–1996), Indian politician
- Sushil Kumar De (1890–1968), Bengali writer
- Sushil Kumar Dhara (1911–2011), Indian revolutionary
- Sushil Kumar 'Indu' Tiwari (born 1959), Indian politician
- Sushil Kumar Modi (born 1952), Indian politician
- Sushil Kumar Pillai (1935–2015), Indian general
- Sushil Kumar Prasad (born 1959), Indian cricketer
- Sushil Kumar Saxena, Indian musicologist, academic, scholar and author
- Sushil Kumar Shakya, Indian politician
- Sushilkumar Shinde (born 1941), Indian politician
- Sushil Kumar Singh (born 1981), Indian football player
- Sushil Kumar Rinku (born 1975), Indian politician
- Sushila Maharjan, Nepalese biochemist and biotechnologist
- Sushil Meitei (born 1997), Indian footballer
- Sushil Nadkarni (born 1976), Indian-American cricketer
- Sushila Nayyar (1914–2001), Indian physician and politician
- Sushil Rajpal, Indian director and producer
- Sushil Ramgoolam (1922–1984), Mauritian politician
- Sushila Rani Patel (1918–2014), Indian classical singer, actress, vocalist, doctor and journalist
- Sushila Rohatgi (1921–2011), Indian politician
- Sushil Roy (1936–2014), Indian politician
- Sushila Samad (1906–1960), Indian poet, journalist, editor and publisher
- Sushila Saroj (born 1951), Indian politician
- Sushil Sen (1892–1915), Indian revolutionary
- Sushila Shrestha, Nepalese politician
- Sushil Shrestha (born 1992), Nepalese model and actor
- Sushil Siddharth (1958–2018), Indian writer, critic, editor and satirist
- Sushila Singh (1938/39–2020), Nepalese judge
- Sushil Singh (born 1976), Indian politician
- Sushila Sirpali Thakuri, Nepalese politician
- Sushila Sundari (1879–1924), Indian circus performer
- Sushila Swar, Nepalese politician
- Shushila Takao (born 1986), New Zealand actress and model
- Sushila Thing, Nepalese politician
- Sushila Tiriya (1956–2026), Indian social worker and politician
- Sushil Uzir (born 1957), Indian cricketer
- Sushil Wadhwani (born 1959), British economist
- Sushila Yawalkar, Indian painter, sculptor and dancer.

== People with first name "Susheel/Susheela" ==
- P. Susheela (born 1935), Indian playback singer
- Susheela Gopalan (1929–2001), Indian communist leader
- Susheela Jayapal (born 1962), American politician
- Susheel Kaur (died 1716), Indian princess
- Susheela Laxman Bangaru (1948–2018), Indian politician
- Susheel Parashar, Indian actor
- Susheela Raman (born 1973), British musician

== See also ==
- Susheela (film), a 1963 Indian film
