= Saurabh Kumar =

Saurabh Kumar may refer to:

- Saurabh Kumar (cricketer) (born 1993), Indian cricketer
- Saurabh Kumar (engineer) (1983–2015), Indian Railways engineering officer and whistleblower
- Saurabh Kumar (ambassador) (born 1966), Indian civil servant and Indian ambassador to Iran
