= Deepak Kumar =

Deepak Kumar may refer to:

- Deepak Kumar (historian) (born 1952), Indian historian
- Deepak Kumar (physicist) (1946–2016), Indian physicist and professor
- Deepak Kumar (politician) (born 1966), Uttar Pradesh MLA and Lok Sabha MP
- Deepak Kumar (sport shooter) (born 1987), Indian sport shooter
