= Udai Kumar =

- Born: 18 March 1960 (age 65); Muzaffarpur, Bihar, India
- Citizenship: Indian
- Education: Patna University; University of Delhi
- Occupations: Managing Director and CEO
- Employer: Metropolitan Stock Exchange of India Ltd
- Spouse: Sapna Kumar (m. 1986)
- Children: 2
- Parent(s): Awadhesh Kumar (Father); Kumud Kumar (Mother)
- Relatives: Navin Kumar (Brother)

Udai Kumar is the managing director and CEO of the Metropolitan Stock Exchange of India Ltd (MSEI) since February 2016. MSEI is India's youngest and one of the three stock exchanges recognized by country's securities market regulator - Securities and Exchange Board of India (SEBI). Kumar served as Interim Chief Executive Officer and Interim Managing Director of Metropolitan Stock Exchange of India Ltd. from 10 October 2015 to February 2016. He has also served as managing director of Metropolitan Clearing Corporation of India Ltd (MCCIL) (Formerly, MCX-SX Clearing Corporation Ltd (MCX-SXCCL). He also serves as a Director of Metropolitan Stock Exchange of India Ltd.

== Early life and education ==
Kumar was born on 18 March 1960 – a son to Awadhesh Kumar and Kumud Kumar. He received his early education at Patna Collegiate School before graduating in physics with Honors from Patna Science College in 1980. He then went on to complete his master's degree in Physics from University of Delhi in 1982. He also completed his MBA from Birla Institute of Technology, Mesra, Ranchi.

== Professional career ==
He started his career as Probationary Officer at United Bank of India. He joined JM Financial & Investment Consultancy Services - a subsidiary of JM Financial Ltd. - in April 1993 as Manager and worked there till January 1999. He then joined JM Morgan Stanley as vice president in 1999. In 2007, he joined JM Financial Consultants as Director and worked on this position till 2009.

He worked as executive director of Mefcom Capital Markets Limited - a capital market company in India - for almost a year in 2009 to 2010. In August 2010, he was appointed as Senior Vice President of Centrum Capital. After a short stint at Centrum he joined as Head of Equity Capital Markets at Fortune Financial Services in December 2010 and worked on this position till November 2013.

In December 2013, he joined Inter-connected Stock Exchange of India as Managing Director. From April 2015 to January 2016 he served as managing director of Metropolitan Clearing Corporation of India Ltd (MCCIL) (Formerly, MCX-SX Clearing Corporation Ltd (MCX-SXCCL). Kumar was appointed as Interim CEO and MD of MSEI on 10 October 2015 and full-time CEO and MD since February 2016.

The capital markets regulator SEBI had conducted a special purpose inspection of MSEI in February 2018 and in November 2022 has barred for six months from being associated with any market infrastructure institution or associated entities over multiple violations.

== Personal life ==
Kumar is married to Sapna Kumar and they have two children. He currently resides in Mumbai with his wife. His elder brother is Navin Kumar - Chairman of GSTN.
