= John Cain Arena =

Stadium in Melbourne Park, Melbourne CBD, Victoria, Australia

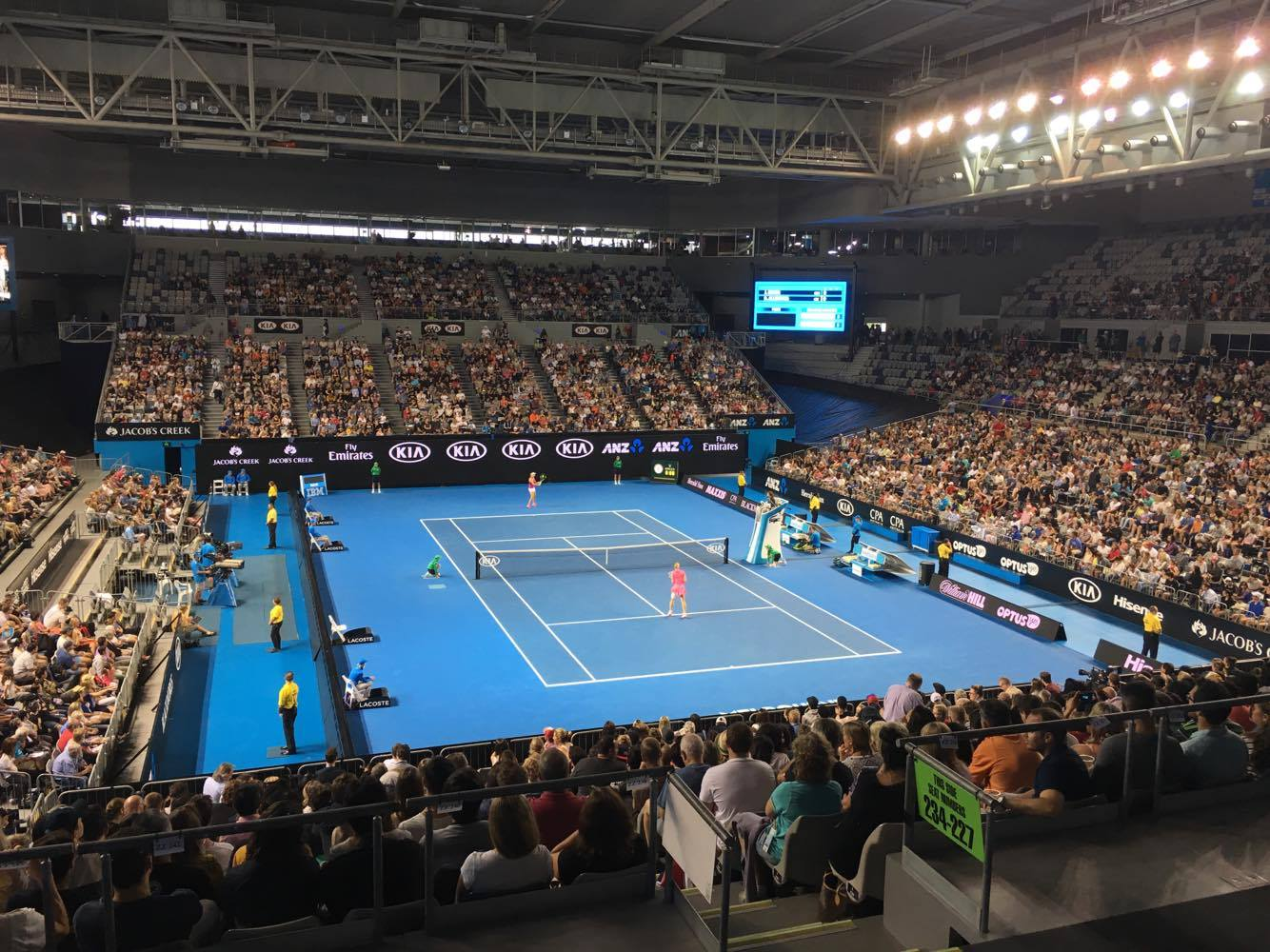
- The arena during the 2016 Australian Open
- Interactive map of John Cain Arena
- Former names: Melbourne Multi Purpose Venue (planning/construction) (2006); Vodafone Arena (2000–2008); Hisense Arena (2008–2018); Melbourne Arena (2018–2020)
- Address: 35 Olympic Blvd; Melbourne VIC 3004; Australia
- Location: Melbourne Park
- Coordinates: 37°49′22″S 144°58′54″E
- Owner: Government of Victoria
- Operator: Melbourne and Olympic Park Trust
- Capacity: 10,300
- Surface: GreenSet (tennis); Hardwood (basketball) (netball)

Construction
- Groundbreaking: 1999
- Opened: 27 July 2000
- Cost: A$65 million
- Architect: Peddle Thorp
- General contractor: Theiss Construction

Tenants
- Basketball; Melbourne United (NBL) 2000–2002, 2012–present South East Melbourne Phoenix (NBL) 2019–present South Dragons (NBL) 2006–2009; Victoria Giants (NBL) 2000–2004; Netball; Melbourne Vixens (ANZ/SSN) 2008–present Melbourne Mavericks (SSN) 2024–present Collingwood Magpies (SSN) 2017–2023; Tennis; Australian Open (Tennis) 2001–present

Website
- Venue Website

Exterior of the arena

John Cain Arena is a multi-purpose sports and entertainment arena located within Melbourne Park in Melbourne, Victoria, Australia. It is the second-largest venue and show court for the Australian Open, the first Grand Slam professional tennis tournament held each calendar year. The arena also hosts various other sporting and entertainment events throughout the year.

The arena has sometimes been dubbed "The People's Court" during Australian Open matches. This is due to its accessibility to patrons holding a ground pass — the cheapest ticket category available — and the close proximity of spectators to the players. The venue is known for its atmosphere, particularly during matches involving Australian players.

== History ==
Construction commenced in the late 1990s, and was completed in 2000. The arena features a cycling track, which is covered over with seating for court events. The tennis court is a GreenSet surface (between 2008 and 2019 the surface was Plexicushion) and the roof is retractable, making it one of the few venues where tennis can be played during rain.

The venue is able to hold a maximum spectator capacity of 11,000 for events such as music concerts where general floor seating or standing room is available. For basketball, netball and tennis the capacity is 10,500. When the velodrome is in use the northern and southern banks of seats, which cover the turns of the velodrome, are raised to reveal the track while the floor seating is removed leaving a reduced capacity of 4,500.

Following the renovation of the Margaret Court Arena as part of a A$363 million upgrade to Melbourne Park in time for the 2015 Australian Open, which included a retractable roof and an increase in capacity from 6,000 to 7,500, both Melbourne United (formerly the Melbourne Tigers) and the Melbourne Vixens announced their intentions to move from the arena to the smaller capacity Margaret Court Arena (MCA) from 2015. However, Melbourne United abandoned their move to MCA after the 2015–16 NBL season and continue to play their games at John Cain Arena, while the Vixens will continue to split their games between John Cain and Margaret Court Arenas, with John Cain used for games expected to attract a larger crowd.

=== Naming rights ===
During construction, the project was referred to as the Melbourne Park Multi-Purpose Venue. When it opened in 2000, a sponsor was immediately assigned naming rights and it became known as the Vodafone Arena. This arrangement lasted for eight years. On 12 May 2008, it was announced that its name would change to Hisense Arena in a multimillion-dollar deal that was originally supposed to last six years. Meanwhile, temporarily throughout the 2006 Commonwealth Games, the Hisense Arena reverted to being called "Multi Purpose Venue" for the duration of the sporting event. In 2014 the naming contract with the multinational Hisense was extended for a further three years. Despite the contract ending at the conclusion of 2017, Hisense Arena remained the name of the venue for several more months, effectively for free.

In August 2018, Tennis Australia announced it had bought the naming rights and had elected to call it Melbourne Arena, saying it preferred a non-commercial title "iconic with the city". The non-corporate name was to be in effect for five years, though the Victorian Government and Tennis Australia did not rule out extending the arena's name beyond that period.

On 3 February 2020, Victorian Premier Daniel Andrews announced that the arena would be renamed "John Cain Arena" in honour of John Cain Jr., the late premier of Victoria, who is regarded as a critical figure in keeping the Australian Open in Melbourne in the mid-1980s. The new name came into effect in December 2020.

== Events ==
=== Tennis ===
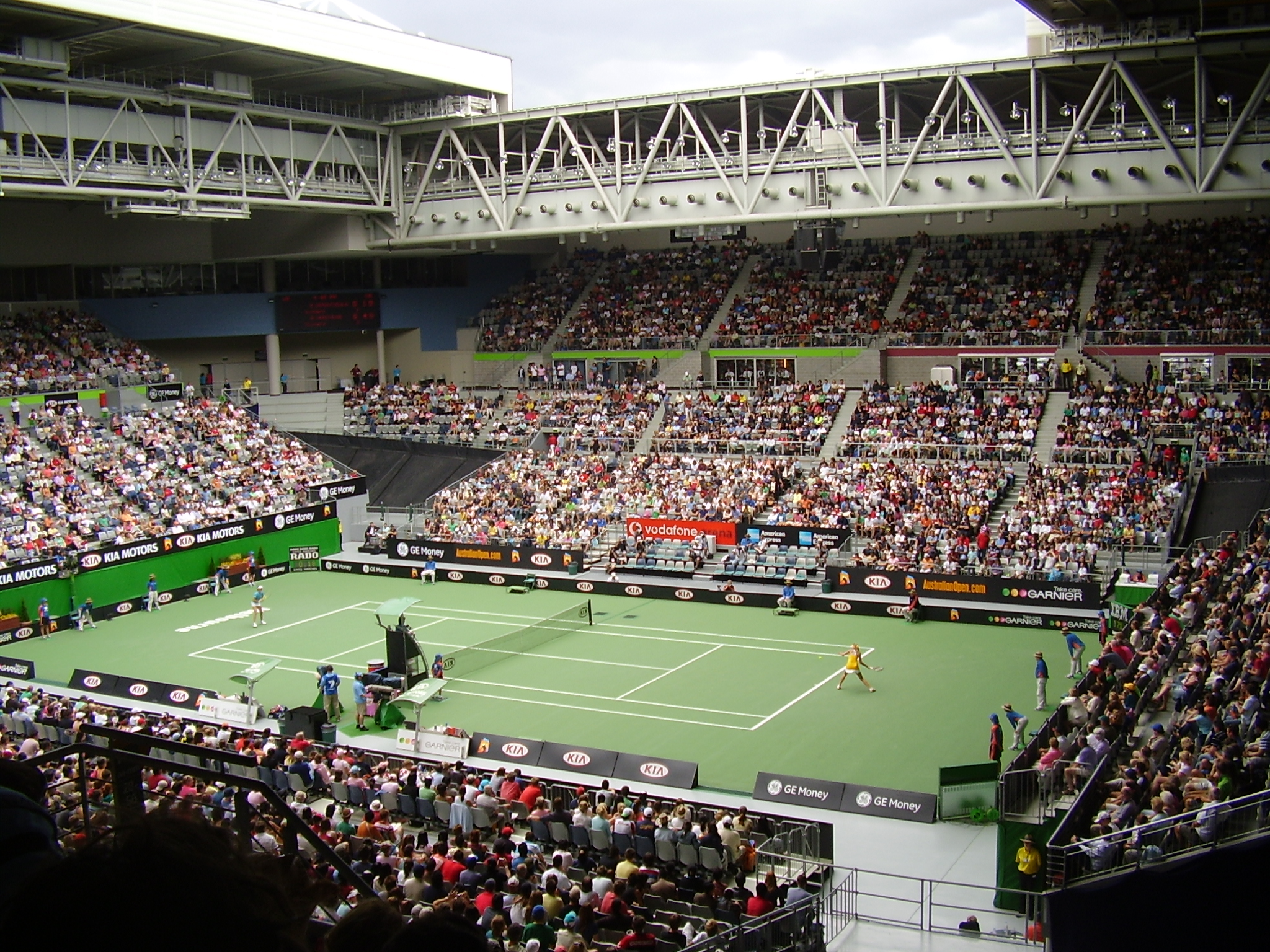
The roof retracted during a daytime match at the 2007 Australian Open.

Every year, the venue hosts many matches as part of the Australian Open tennis tournament. It has usually only been used for day matches in the first 10 days of the tournament. In 2012 the venue began hosting night matches during the first week of the tournament, at the same time as matches being played on the adjacent Rod Laver Arena. The first Australian Open match played at the venue was on 15 January 2001 and lasted less than ten minutes, when Monica Seles advanced to the second round after Brie Rippner was felled with injury in the second game of the match. The first match completed on the court was Tim Henman's first round win over Hicham Arazi.

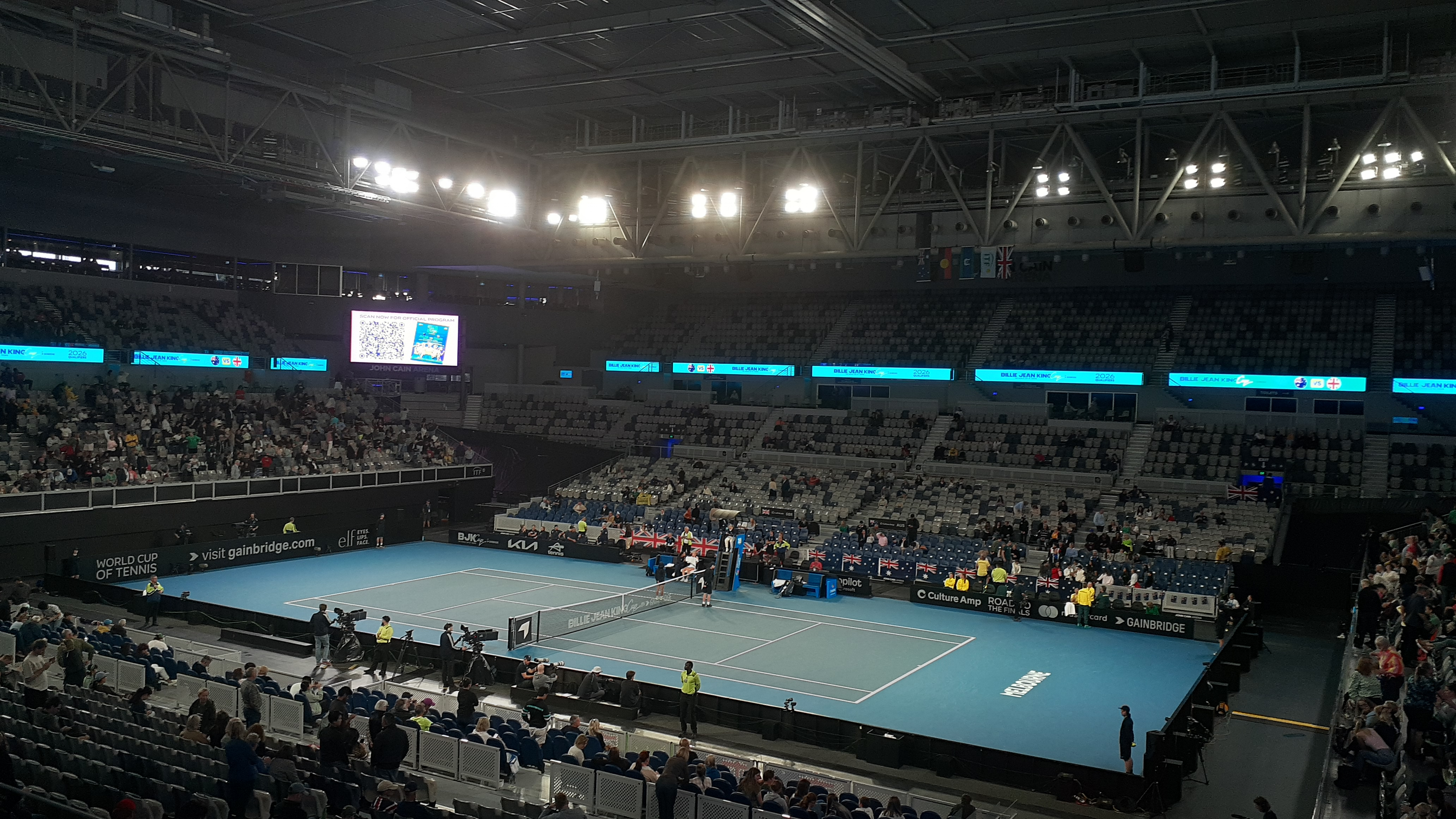
John Cain Arena during a Billie Jean King Cup Qualifier Tie between Australia and Great Britain - 10 April 2026

On 10-11 April 2026, the arena hosted a qualifying round for the 2026 Billie Jean King Cup between Australia and Great Britain. This was the first professional tennis event outside of the Australian Open to be held at the venue.

=== Basketball ===
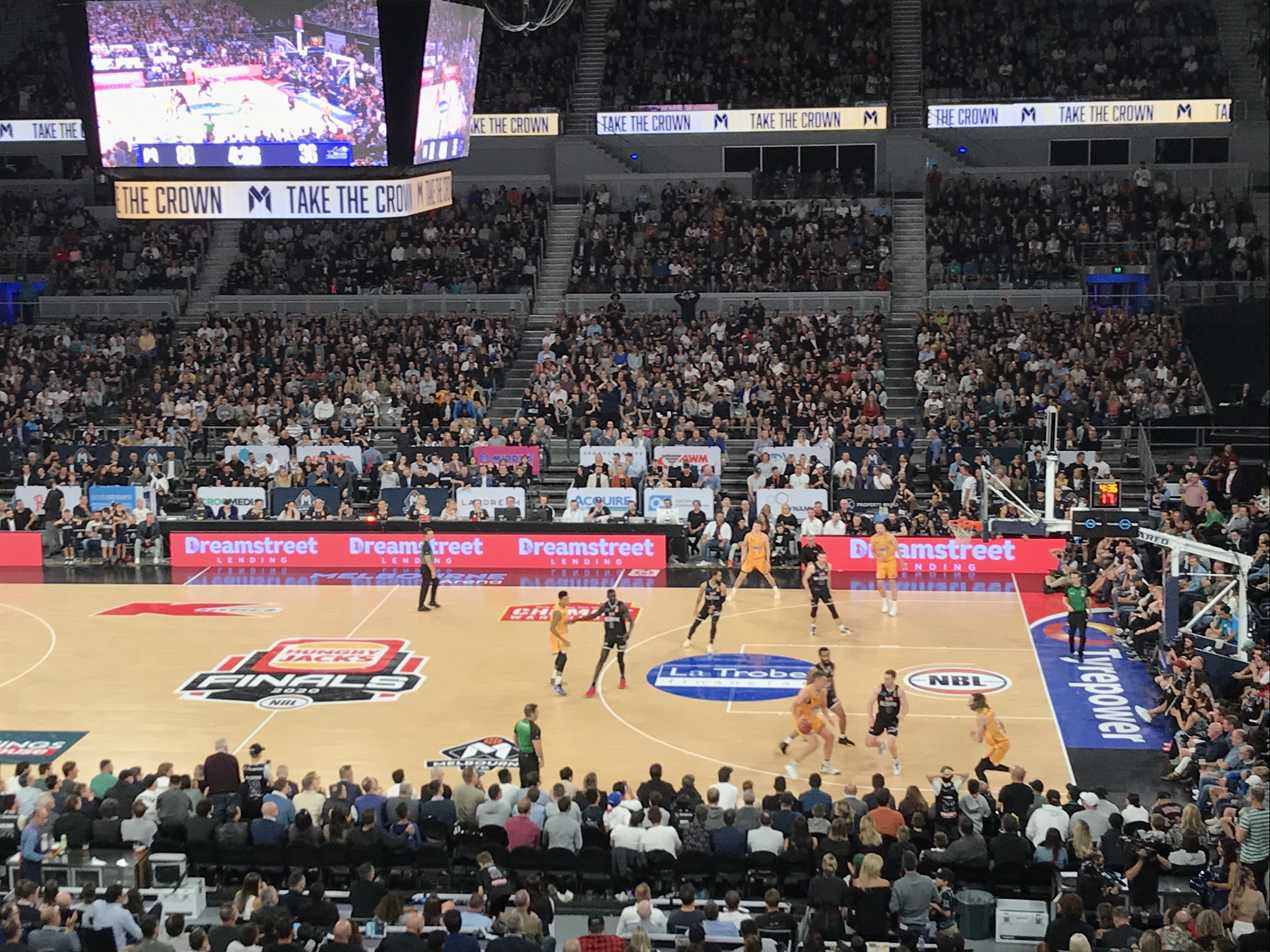
Melbourne United (pictured) and rivals South East Melbourne Phoenix play their home games at the arena.

John Cain Arena is the main home court of National Basketball League (NBL) teams Melbourne United and South East Melbourne Phoenix. Formerly, the Victoria Titans and South Dragons used it as their home, until high rental prices forced the teams to find other venues. Until this move the venue was largely devoid of sporting events outside of the two weeks of the Australian Open tournament held each January. The Dragons, founded in 2006 until they withdrew from the competition after winning the championship in 2009, played three seasons at the arena. For the 2012–13 NBL season, the Tigers (now renamed Melbourne United) returned to the venue, and played 7 of their 13 home games at the arena. They later shifted all home matches to the venue. The Phoenix, who made their debut in the 2019–20 NBL season, share their home with John Cain Arena and the State Basketball Centre in Wantirna South.

The largest basketball crowd was on 4 December 2016 during the 2016–17 NBL season when 10,300 fans saw Melbourne United defeat the New Zealand Breakers 98–74. This broke the previous basketball attendance record of 9,308 set in 2008 in a local derby game between the South Dragons and Melbourne Tigers.

The venue co-hosted the 2007 FIBA Oceania Championship where the Australian national basketball team won the gold medal.

John Cain Arena has also hosted several Harlem Globetrotters Exhibition Games during their tours of Australia.

On 4 February 2023, John Cain Arena hosted a WNBL game between the Southside Flyers and the Sydney Flames following increased interest in the match due to the participation of Hall of Fame player Lauren Jackson. The game set a WNBL record of 7,681 spectators.

=== Netball ===
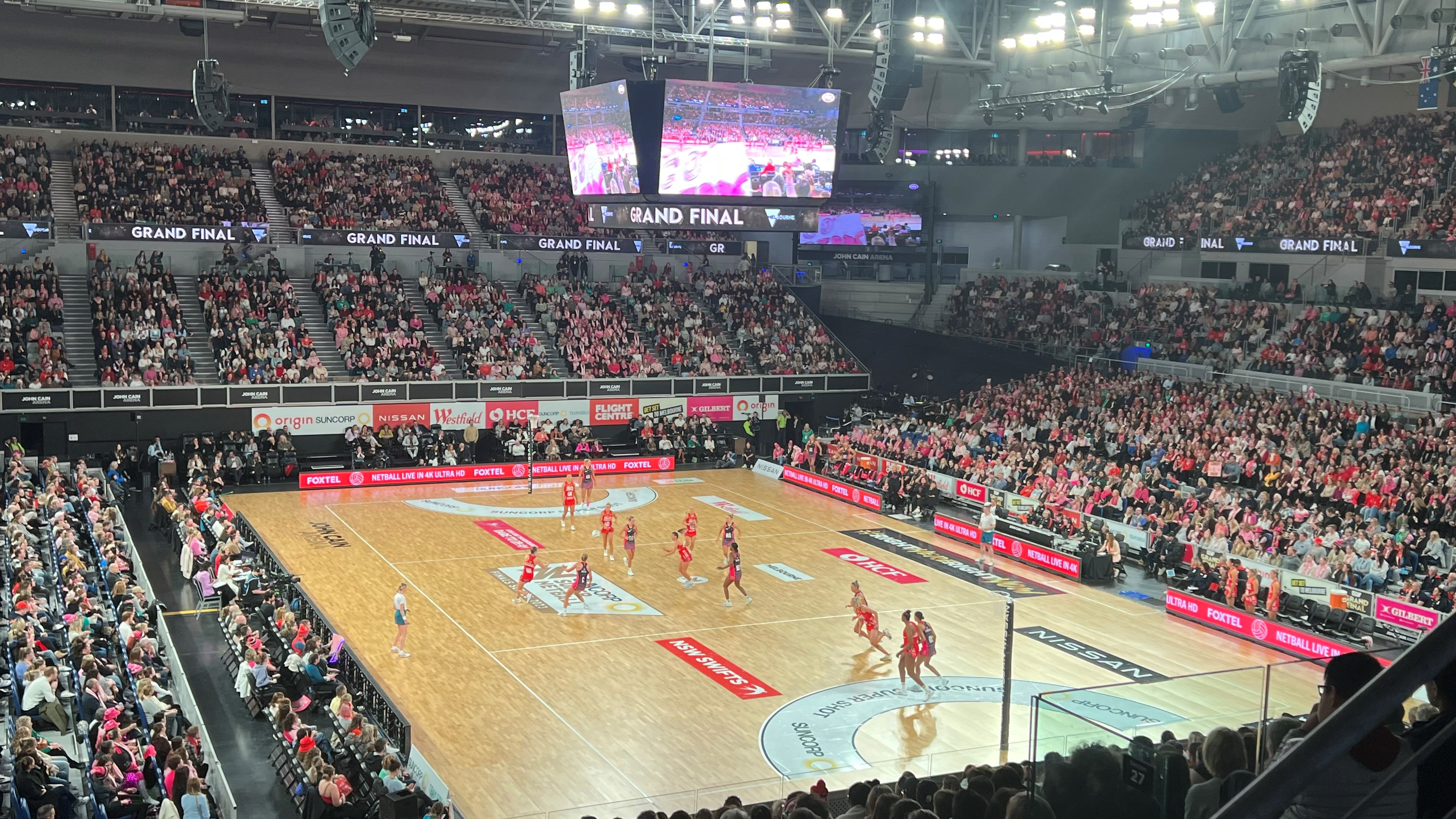
The Melbourne Vixens play their home games at the arena, which was also host to the 2023 Super Netball Grand Final (pictured).

Netball is played regularly at the venue. It is the home court of the Melbourne Vixens and Melbourne Mavericks in the Suncorp Super Netball competition. The Melbourne Phoenix and Melbourne Kestrels also played games at the arena in the Commonwealth Bank Trophy before merging to form the Vixens. The Vixens also used it for home games in the ANZ Championship.

The Australian Diamonds sometime play home international fixtures at the venue. The venue also hosted the 2016, 2017 and 2018 Fast5 Netball World Series.

The largest netball attendance at the arena was on 20 November 2004 when 10,300 saw the Diamonds defeat New Zealand 53 to 51.

=== Commonwealth Games ===
During the 2006 Commonwealth Games the stadium was used for basketball, track cycling and other sports. Its name was changed to Multi-Purpose Venue with all Vodafone-related signage covered over with black shrouds because Telstra, a competitor of Vodafone, was a major sponsor of the games.

=== Cycling ===
In 2004 and 2012, the UCI Track Cycling World Championships were held at the venue. Other events were UCI World Cup events and Australian Madison Championships.

=== Ice hockey ===
On 14 and 15 June 2013, the venue played host to an ice hockey exhibition series between teams representing the United States and Canada.

=== Kabaddi ===
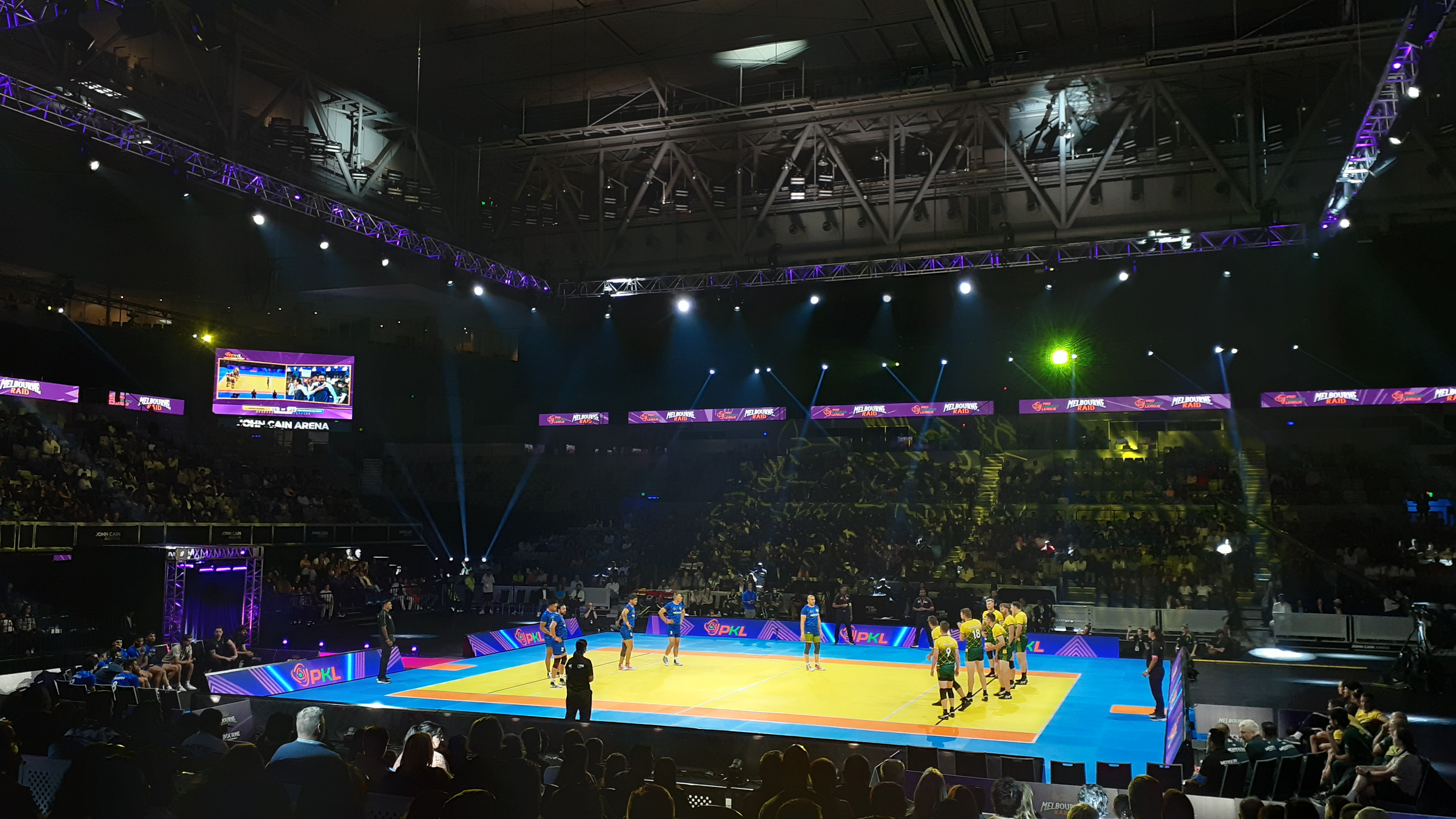
A Kabaddi Exhibition Match at John Cain Arena, as part of the Pro Kabaddi League Melbourne Raid - 28 December 2024

On 28 December 2024, one day before the 2024 Pro Kabaddi League Final, the Pro Kabaddi League hosted the Pro Kabaddi League: Melbourne Raid at the arena. The Event featured two Kabaddi All Star Exhibition matches.

=== Entertainment ===
The arena hosts several musical and entertainment events each year, in concert with other venues in the precinct. On 26 February 2007, Irish boy band Westlife held a concert for The Love Tour supporting their LP The Love Album. On 18 September 2018, Taiwanese vocal pop band Mayday held a concert for Life Tour supporting their album History of Tomorrow. From 2011 to 2013 the venue hosted the Melbourne judges' audition stages of the Seven Network singer search program The X Factor. Its also been the home to the Victorian State Schools Spectacular since 2008.

In November 2022, a stampede occurred outside the venue prior to a concert for American singer Steve Lacy, with poor organization by stadium management being blamed for it. The concert was originally fixtured to be held at The Forum Theatre in Melbourne's central business district, but was upgraded due to high demand.

== See also ==
- List of sports venues named after individuals
- List of tennis stadiums by capacity
- List of indoor arenas in Australia

Preceded by Hanns-Martin-Schleyer-Halle; Stuttgart	UCI Track Cycling World Championships; Venue; 2004	Succeeded by VELO Sports Center; Los Angeles
Preceded by Apeldoorn Omnisport Centre; Apeldoorn	UCI Track Cycling World Championships; Venue; 2012	Succeeded by Minsk-Arena; Minsk
