= Dinesh Kumar (basketball) =

Indian basketball player and coach

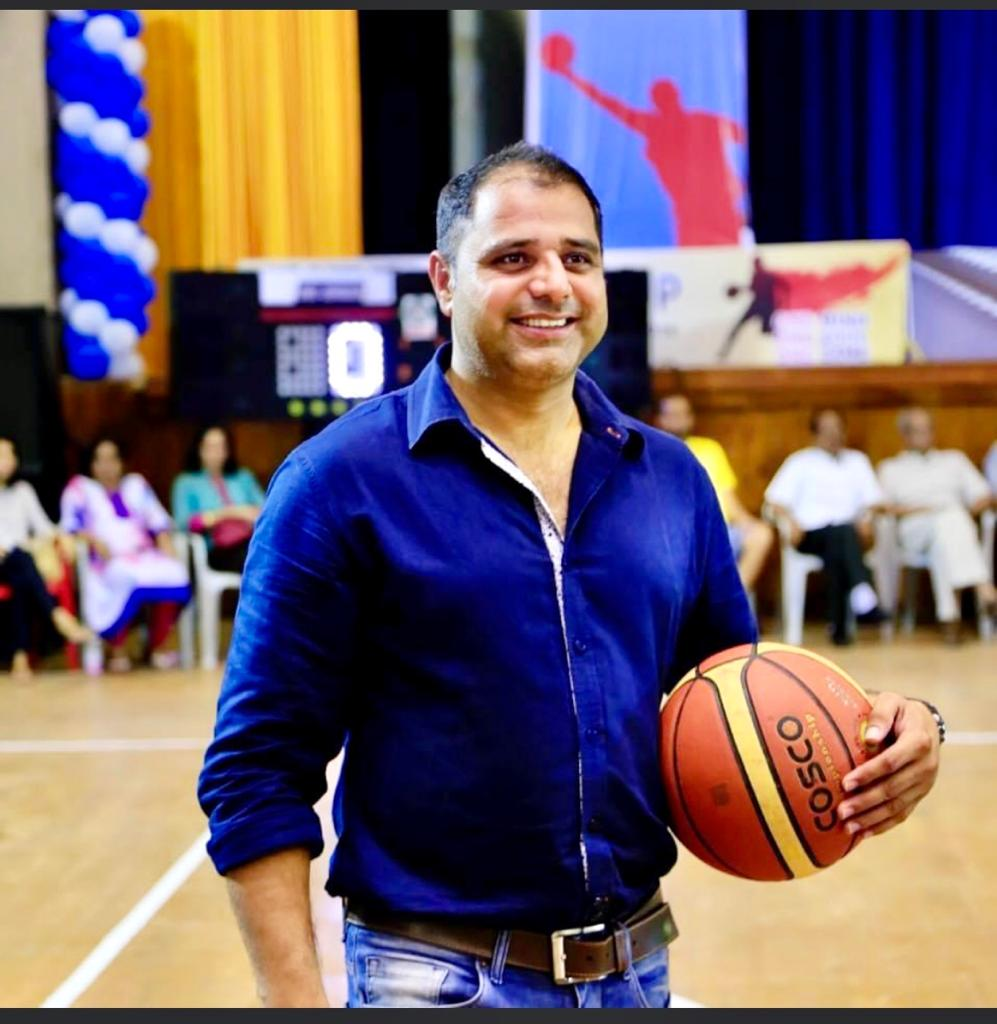
- Kumar at the ARISE Steel Tournament Championships in Chennai
- Born: 13 December 1979 (age 45)
- Occupation: Basketball player

Dinesh Kumar (born 13 December 1979) is an Indian professional basketball player and coach who was part of the Indian Masters Basketball Team. Dinesh is currently the coach of ONGC Basketball Team and Uttarakhand team.

== Early life ==
Dinesh Kumar represented the Uttar Pradesh Basketball Team in Senior National Championship held at Bangalore in the years 2001 to 2002. He later shifted his base to Uttrakhand and went on to represent the state team from 2003 to 2011. He also played for ONGC and represented the team at Federation Cup Basketball Championship in varying years from 2003 to 2014. Dinesh also played for the Indian Masters Basketball Team in 2019 European Masters Games in Turin, Italy and 2018 European Masters Games in Malaysia.

Dinesh is now a coach of ONGC Basketball Team and Uttarakhand team.

== Achievements ==
- Coach of Uttarakhand State Basketball team that participated in the 67th Senior National Basketball championship and won gold medal, at Puducherry in 2017.
- Coach of ONGC Basketball team that participated in Federation Cup and won gold medal, at Goa in 2016.
- Coach of the ONGC Basketball Team Participated in Federation Cup and won gold medal, Coimbatore in 2017.
