= Satish Kumar (pastor) =

Indian past and temple founder

- Occupation: Pastor
- Employer: Founder of Calvary Temple

Satish Kumar is an Indian pastor who is the founder of Calvary Temple. He founded the Calvary Temple in Hyderabad, India in 2005. As of 2019, Calvary Temple has 225,000 members.
