= Sushil Kanwar =

Indian politician

Zila Pramukh Ajmer
- In office 2020–incumbent
- Preceded by: Vandana Nogiya
- Constituency: Ajmer

Member of the Rajasthan Legislative Assembly
- In office 2013–2018
- Preceded by: Bhramdev Kumawat
- Succeeded by: Rakesh Pareek
- Constituency: Masuda (Rajasthan Assembly constituency)

Personal details
- Party: Bhartiya Janta Party
- Occupation: Politician

Sushil Kanwar is an Indian politician from the Bhartiya Janta Party and Zila Pramukh Of Ajmer District, Rajasthan, She was a member of the Rajasthan Legislative Assembly representing the Masuda Vidhan Sabha constituency of Rajasthan.
