= Arup Kumar Kundu =

Indian medical writer (born 1958)

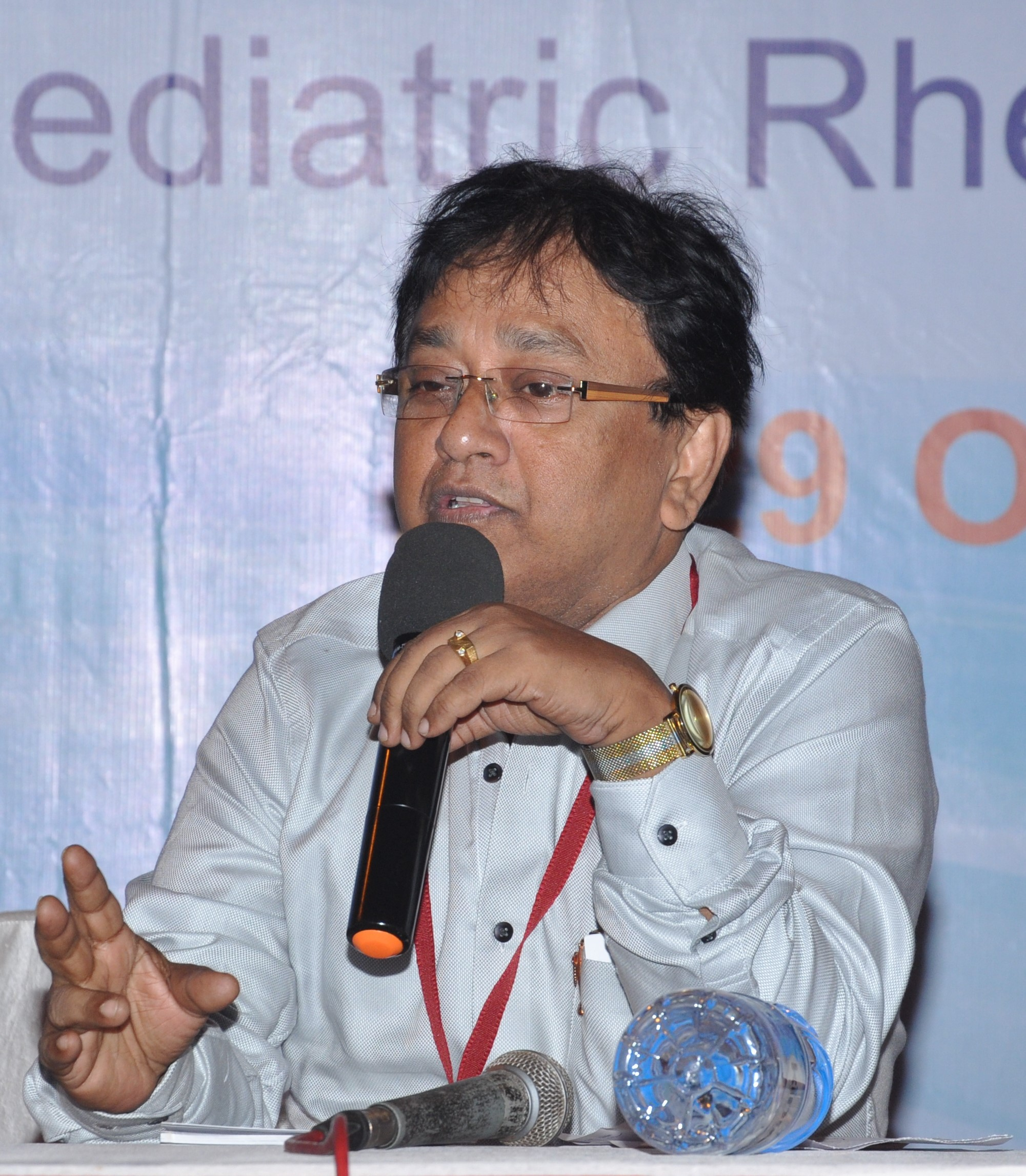
- Born: 2 January 1958 (age 68); Calcutta, West Bengal, India (now Kolkata, India)
- Education: Calcutta National Medical College Kolkata, (1975–1981); IPGMER and SSKM Hospital (Medicine) (1984–1986); University of Calcutta
- Years active: 1985–present
- Known for: Author of 'Bedside Clinics in Medicine' Part I & Part II; 'Pearls in Medicine for Students'; 'Kundu's Practical Medicine'; 'MCQs in Internal Medicine' and 'Memorable Memoirs of a Medico'
- Medical career
- Profession: DoctorGeneral Medicine
- Institutions: Nil Ratan Sircar Medical College and Hospital, Kolkata; Burdwan Medical College Burdwan; R. G. Kar Medical College and Hospital Kolkata; KPC Medical College and Hospital Kolkata; IQ City Medical College Durgapur
- Sub-specialties: Rheumatology
- Awards: Marquis Who's Who biography enlisted in 2014, 2015, 2016 Marquis Who's Who in Science & Engineering biography enlisted in 2016–17

Arup Kumar Kundu (Bengali "অরূপ কুমার কুন্ডু") (born 2 January 1958) is an educationist, Indian rheumatologist, academician, medical researcher, clinician, orator, teacher and author. He has authored six books, including Bedside Clinics in Medicine, Part I & Part II, Pearls in Medicine, Kundu's Practical Medicine, MCQs in Internal Medicine and Memorable Memoirs of a Medico.

== Early life ==
Kundu was born on 2 January 1958, in Kolkata in the Indian state of West Bengal to a middle-class Bengali family. His father was (Late) Prof. (Dr.) Amiya Kumar Kundu, a physician, pulmonologist and clinician. Due to his father's transferable job, he traveled over West Bengal extensively.

He studied in schools such as Sishu Siksha Bhavan (Kolkata), Gangarampur Mission School and Uluberia High School (Uluberia, Howrah), Jalpaiguri Zilla School, Midnapur Collegiate School and lastly Hooghly Collegiate School. Kundu received National scholarship in school leaving examination to continue his undergraduate studies.

Kundu passed and completed MBBS in 1981 with several scholarships in different years of the course. He was awarded medals and distinctions on multiple subjects.

He is a rank holder in General Medicine (1981) from the University of Calcutta; received Honours in Chemistry, PSM and General Medicine. He Passed MD in General Medicine in 1986 (1984–86 session) from IPGMER and SSKM Hospital (Institute of Post Graduate Medical Education and Research), Kolkata. He received gold medal for his MD Thesis work on lymphoma.

Arup Kumar Kundu is married to Bijoya, who is a homemaker (MSc, Physics), and the couple has one son and one daughter, Dr. Abhishek and Ms. Ushasi (B.Tech, MBA).

== Career ==
Kundu joined the West Bengal Health Service in 1985 and shifted to the West Bengal Medical Education Service (WBMES) in 1993. He became a Professor in Medicine in 2009. Kundu served as Medical officer at Murshidabad district; and as a teacher in Nil Ratan Sircar Medical College and Hospital, Burdwan Medical College and Hospital, and R. G. Kar Medical College and Hospital. He served in the West Bengal Government Health service for more than 25 years and took voluntary retirement in 2010. Kundu continues to serve the medical fraternity through private medical colleges.

Kundu served as In-charge, Division of Rheumatology for 15 years in different Government and Private Medical Colleges. He takes part as a leader in medical education as lecturer and author.

Kundu is actively involved in the clinical Governance at IQ City Medical College, Durgapur and previously in KPC Medical College and Hospital Kolkata. He set up a Rheumatology service practice under Department of General Medicine in these hospitals.

He is an examiner in different universities for both Undergraduate and Postgraduate medical students, and is an affiliated adjudicator of Thesis work. Dr. Kundu completed the National Teacher's Training Course (NTTC) at Banaras Hindu University, Varanasi. He attended workshops as a resource person in different State Health Development Project, Government of West Bengal / Educational consultants India Ltd. (a Govt. of India Enterprise) for Distance Learning Packages (DLP).

Kundu is a member of Association of Physicians of India (API), Indian Rheumatology Association (IRA), Indian Medical Association (IMA), National Advisory Board – JAPI (2008–2009), Advisory Board – JK Science (a peer-reviewed Medical Journal) and a Fellow at Indian College of Physicians (FICP). He has served as Chairman–Academic Committee, Joint Secretary, Vice Chairman and Chairman of Indian Rheumatology Association (IRA), West Bengal branch. He is now holding the post of President, Eastern Zone Rheumatology Association, India. Kundu is a member of International forums like New York Academy of Sciences (USA) and International Advisory Panel of Kumar and Clark's textbook, Clinical Medicine, 7th -10th Editions.

Dr. Kundu has been conferred upon fellowship of Royal College of Physicians (FRCP), Edinburgh and awarded by API as 'Gifted Teacher' of India, 2022. He serves as a mentor and Instructional Coach, pan-India for teaching in MBBS, MD, DNB and MRCP courses.

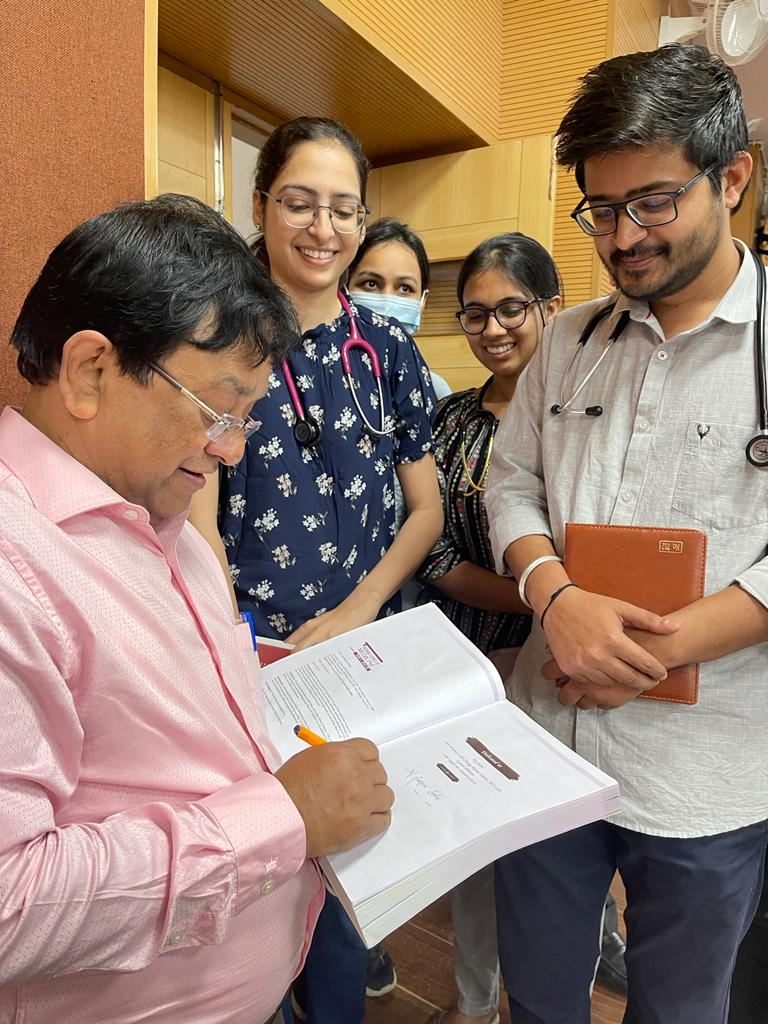
Kundu giving autographs to this students-cum-followers in a Medical College at Jaipur, Rajasthan, India in 2022

He has in his credit approximately 6000 hours of teaching bedside clinics including theoretical lectures in the long tenure of medical education service in Government and Private medical colleges for nearly 35 years.

Arup Kumar Kundu is a Guest Lecturer at several Medical colleges and Universities throughout India. Kundu acted as an assessor in Public Service Commission (PSC, West Bengal) Public Service Commission, West Bengal and Union Public Service Commission (UPSC, New Delhi) Union Public Service Commission from time to time. He serves as a referee / reviewer in Indexed Journals. Kundu's biography was enlisted in Marquis Who's Who in the World, in consecutive years 2014, 2015 and 2016 and also in Marquis Who's Who in Science and Engineering in 2016–17. He has en-massed a large base of fan-following doctors because of his popular medical books and motivational speeches.

== Research ==
Kundu conducted and presented research works in Medicine throughout his career. A study on 'Interferon-alpha in the treatment of acute prolonged hepatitis B virus infection' was published in JAPI in 2000. His study on epidemiology, clinical spectrum and management of rheumatoid arthritis, spondyloarthropathy and gout (ongoing study) are presented from time to time in different All India Conference of Physicians / Rheumatologists, and published in indexed Medical Journals.

== Publications ==
Kundu published 121 articles on Internal Medicine in Index Medicus Journals and many in peer-reviewed non-indexed journals. He contributed chapters in several national and international books. His chapters include a section in Online Appendix on 'Arsenic poisoning' in "Kumar & Clark's" textbook Clinical Medicine 6th – 10th editions and a new Chapter on Gout in 9th & 10th edition of the book Elsevier; author of Chapters in API Text Book of Medicine (2008); Postgraduate Medicine (2009); Medicine Update (2010 - 2015, 2017, 2018, 2021–24); textbook on Rheumatology: Principles and Practice in 2010; Progress in Medicine (2016, 2019, 2020, 2023, 2024); Rheumatology Clinics: Clinical Scenarios (2024) and; Manual of Rheumatology (5th Edition, 2018; 6th Edition, 2024).

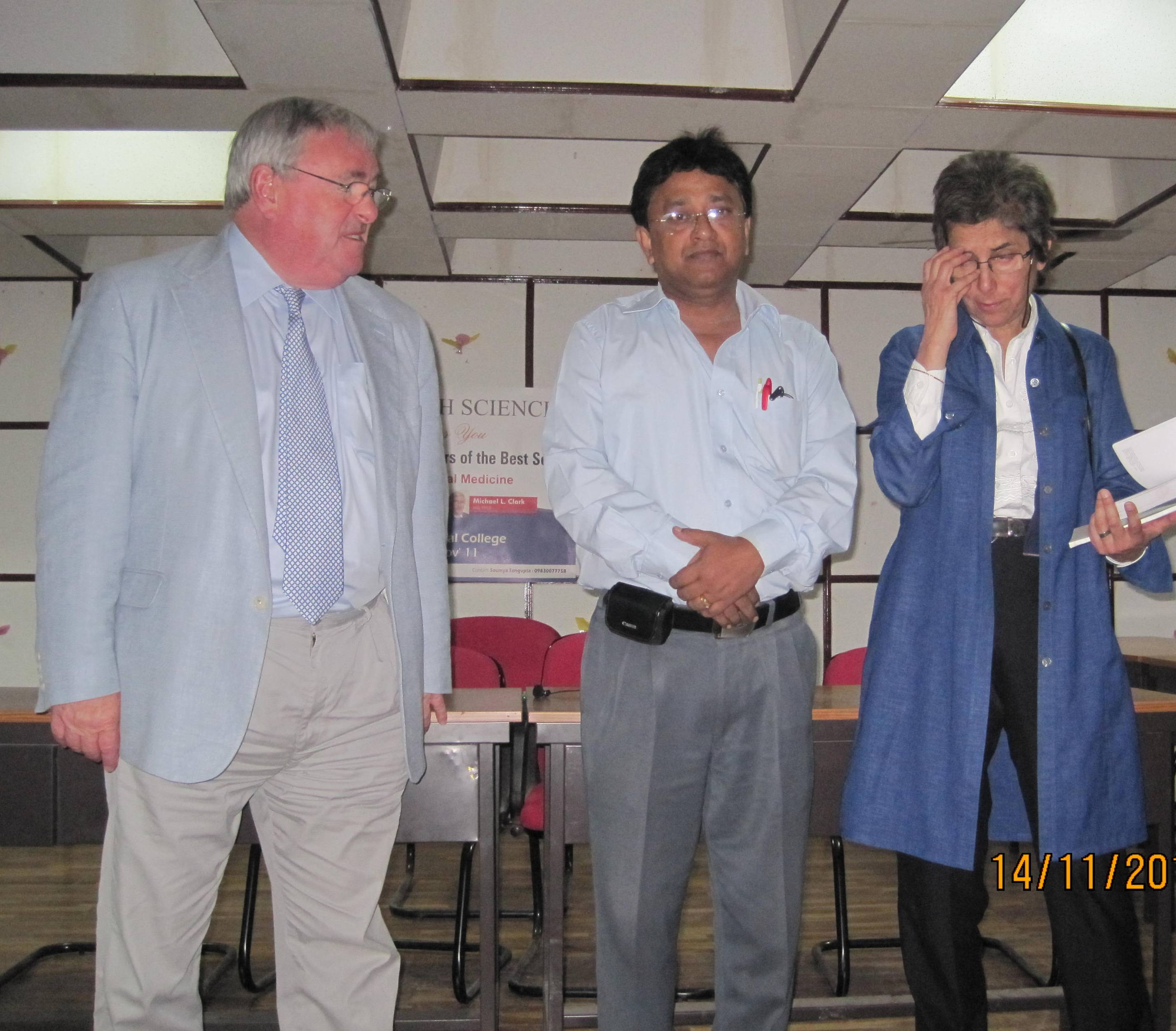
Kundu with great authors, Parveen Kumar and Michael Clark in 2011

He has been referred in approximately 800 citations nationally and internationally. Dr. Kundu has published two rare cases in JAPI (The Journal of the Association of Physicians of India) - one acclaimed as the third reported case of 'Amiodarone-Induced Systemic Lupus Erythematosus', in the world literature in 2003; and the other acclaimed as the second reported case of 'Carcinoma of the Gall Bladder Presenting as Dermatomyositis', in the world literature in 2005.
