= Srini Kumar =

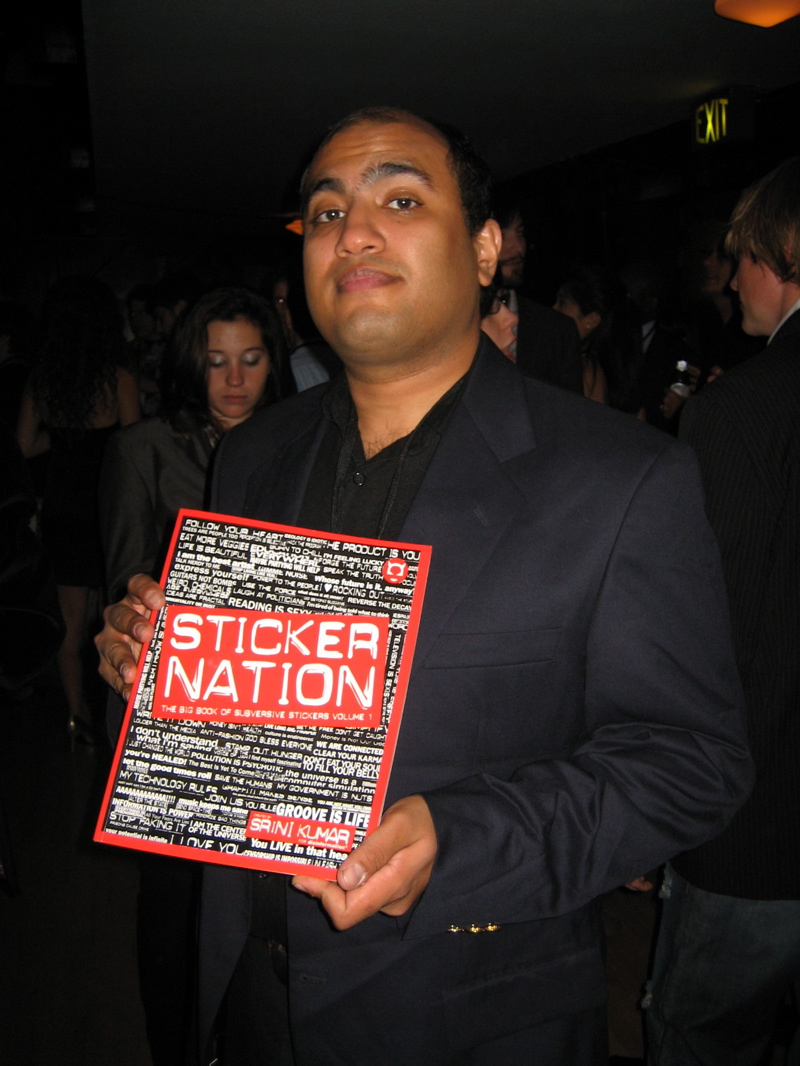
Srini Kumar holding a copy of Sticker Nation at the 2006 Vloggies

Srini Kumar (srini), is the founder of the Unamerican.com website in 1994, which sold stickers and other paraphernalia showcasing counterculture. Srini has written the book StickerNation, a book of 432 stickers published by Disinformation. He is also bassist and frontman for the San Francisco surf-rock band the Aquamen. He also founded the Webzine online magazine conference series in 1998.

He is also the creator of Tinyvox application. Tinyvox turns Facebook, Twitter, email and message boards into a huge voicemail system.
