= Rohit Kumar =

Rohit Kumar may refer to:

- Rohit Kumar (actor) (born 1996), Indian actor and comedian
- Rohit Kumar (footballer) (born 1997), Indian football midfielder
- Rohit Kumar (kabaddi), Indian kabaddi player
- Rohit Kumar (para athlete) (born 1992), Indian shot putter
- Rohit Kumar (rower) (born 1995), Indian rower
- Rohit Kumar (volleyball) (born 1996), Indian volleyball player
- Rohit Kumar Mehraulia (born 1976), Indian musician and politician
- Rohit Kumar Paudel (born 2002), Nepalese cricketer
