= Mala Kumar =

Indian American novelist and LGBTQ activist

- Born: Virginia, United States
- Education: Computer Science from Virginia Tech, Virginia, United States
- Occupations: Novelist, technologist and artist
- Notable work: The Paths of Marriage (2014) and What it Meant to Survive (2024)
- Website: http://www.malakumar.com/

Mala Kumar is an Indian American novelist, LGBTQ activist and technologist. As a tech leader she rendered her services with the United Nations, the World Health Organization and GitHub. Now she lives in New York City with her partner.

== Works ==
Kumar's novels chiefly focus on her personal experiences of living as an Indian-American gay woman.

The Paths of Marriage (2014) is Kumar's debut novel. This novel, following three generations of Indian and Indian-American women, surfaces generational conflict, cultural assimilation, and identity over the subject of lesbianism when Deepa, the third generation character in this novel, often identified with Kumar herself, comes in conflict with other members of the family for being her lesbian sexual orientation.

What it Meant to Survive (2024) is based on Kumar's own experience pertaining to the Virginia Tech massacre (2007). The novel narrates the survivors' confrontation with intersectional guilt and trauma that finds ultimate shelter in queer love.

== Personal life ==
Kumar attended Virginia Tech at the time of the Virginia Tech shooting in 2007, and knew several of those killed.

Kumar met her wife in 2017.
