= Mukul Kumar =

Indian author

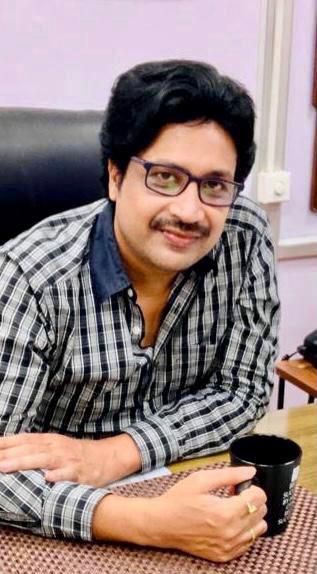
- Occupations: Civil servant, writer
- Writing career
- Language: English, Hindi
- Genres: Poetry and fiction

Mukul Kumar is an Indian civil servant and writer. He works for the Indian Railway Traffic Service in New Delhi.

His published works include four novels, As Boys Become Men, Seduction By Truth, Aarzoo-Arshan (e-book), Lost in the Love Maze, and three poetry collections, The Irrepressible Echos, Catharsis. and Rhythm of the Ruins. Mukul recently translated his debut English novel, As Boys Become Men into Hindi, which has been published as Aarohi.
