= Himanshu Kumar =

Indian activist

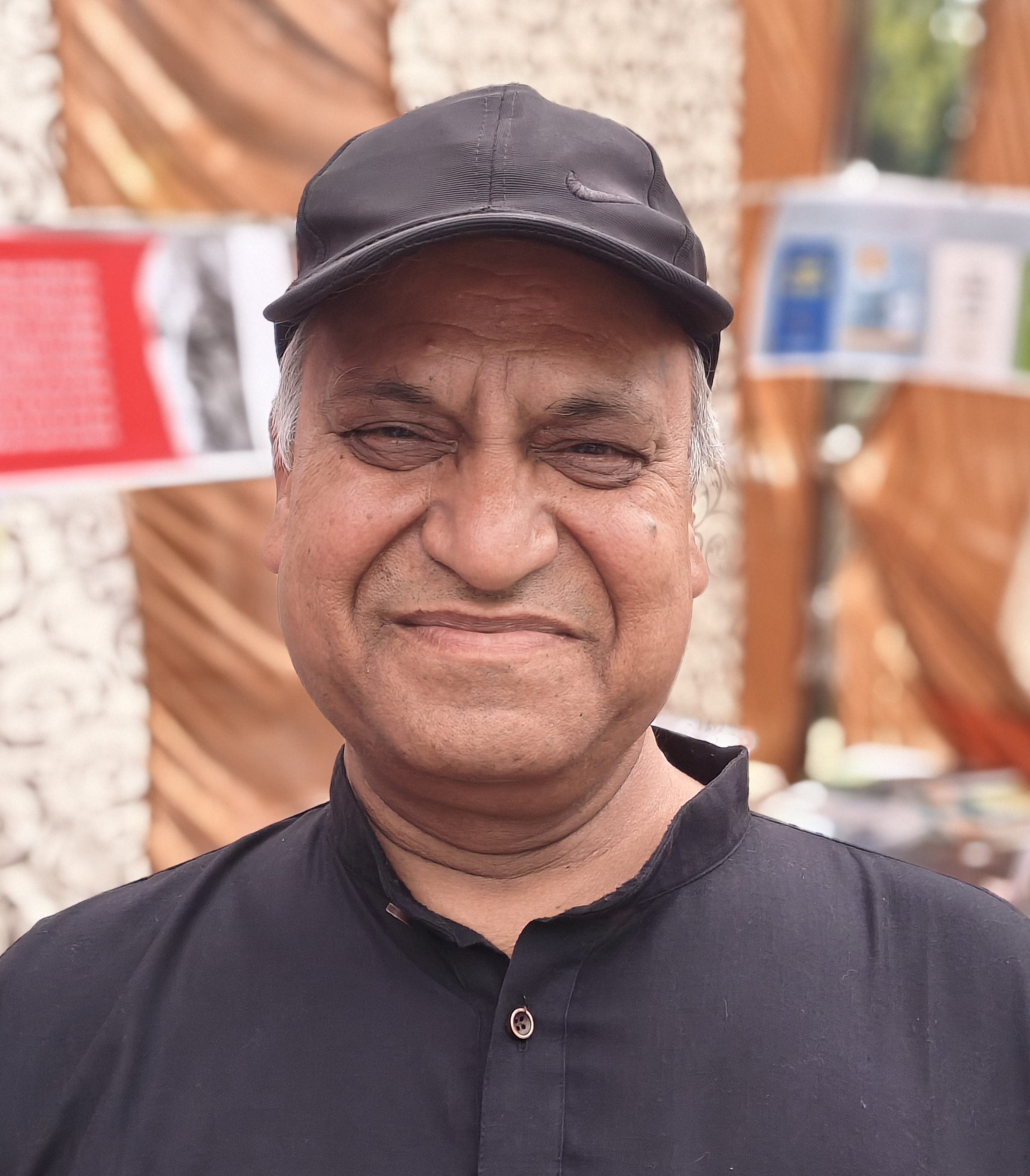
- Born: Muzaffarnagar, Uttar Pradesh, India
- Occupation: Social activist
- Father: Lakshmindraprakash Sharma

Himanshu Kumar is an Indian Gandhian activist, best known for his activism for the tribal communities of the Indian state of Chhattisgarh. He founded a non-profit organization named Vanvasi Chetna Ashram in Dantewada district (now Sukma district) of Chhattisgarh, which he ran from 1992 to 2009.

== Biography ==
Kumar was born in Muzaffarnagar, Uttar Pradesh and both his parents were freedom fighters. He grew up in Gandhi Ashram, Meerut, Uttar Pradesh. His father, Prakashbhai Sharma, worked closely with Mahatma Gandhi and Vinoba Bhave.

After visiting Dantewada in 1988 with activist Nirmala Deshpande and his father, he decided to move to Dantewada with his wife in 1992 and founded the Vanvasi Chetna Ashram along with her. The ashram worked to educate the tribals about their legal rights. The ashram was demolished on 17 May 2009 by the police.

Over the years, he extensively worked in the Bastar district with the government to raise awareness on malaria & literacy, and against the government over alleged human rights violations, especially during the Salwa Judum movement.

Over the years, Kumar has filed over 519 petitions related to alleged fake encounters, rape, and loot by the Indian security forces.

== Chhattisgarh tribals killing case ==
In 2009, Kumar, along with 12 tribals, filed a Public Interest Litigation with the Supreme Court of India to investigate the alleged killing of 17 tribals from the Dantewada district (now Sukma district) by Chhattisgarh Police as a part of Operation Green Hunt in September and October 2009. The petition sought an independent inquiry into the killings while also asking the court to direct the government to provide compensation to the kin of the deceased.

On 14 July 2022, the Supreme Court dismissed the petition and imposed a fine of Rs 5 lakh on Kumar. The court cited the first information reports and the chargesheets filed in the case and noted that the tribals were killed by Maoists. Kumar refused to pay the fine and said "I will not pay the fine as I have not done anything wrong."
