= Niru Kumar =

Indian social worker

- Occupation: Indian social activist
- Awards: Padma Shri 2021

Niru Kumar is an Indian social activist. In 2021, she was awarded Padma Shri by the Indian Government for her contribution in social work.

== Career ==
Kumar started her career in 2012 with the work of gender empowerment and diversity. She worked as a senior officer in Central Government Health Scheme for 25 years. In 2020, she was chosen as one of the national icons of the Election Commission of India.

== Awards ==
- Padma Shri in 2021
