= Yuva Kumar =

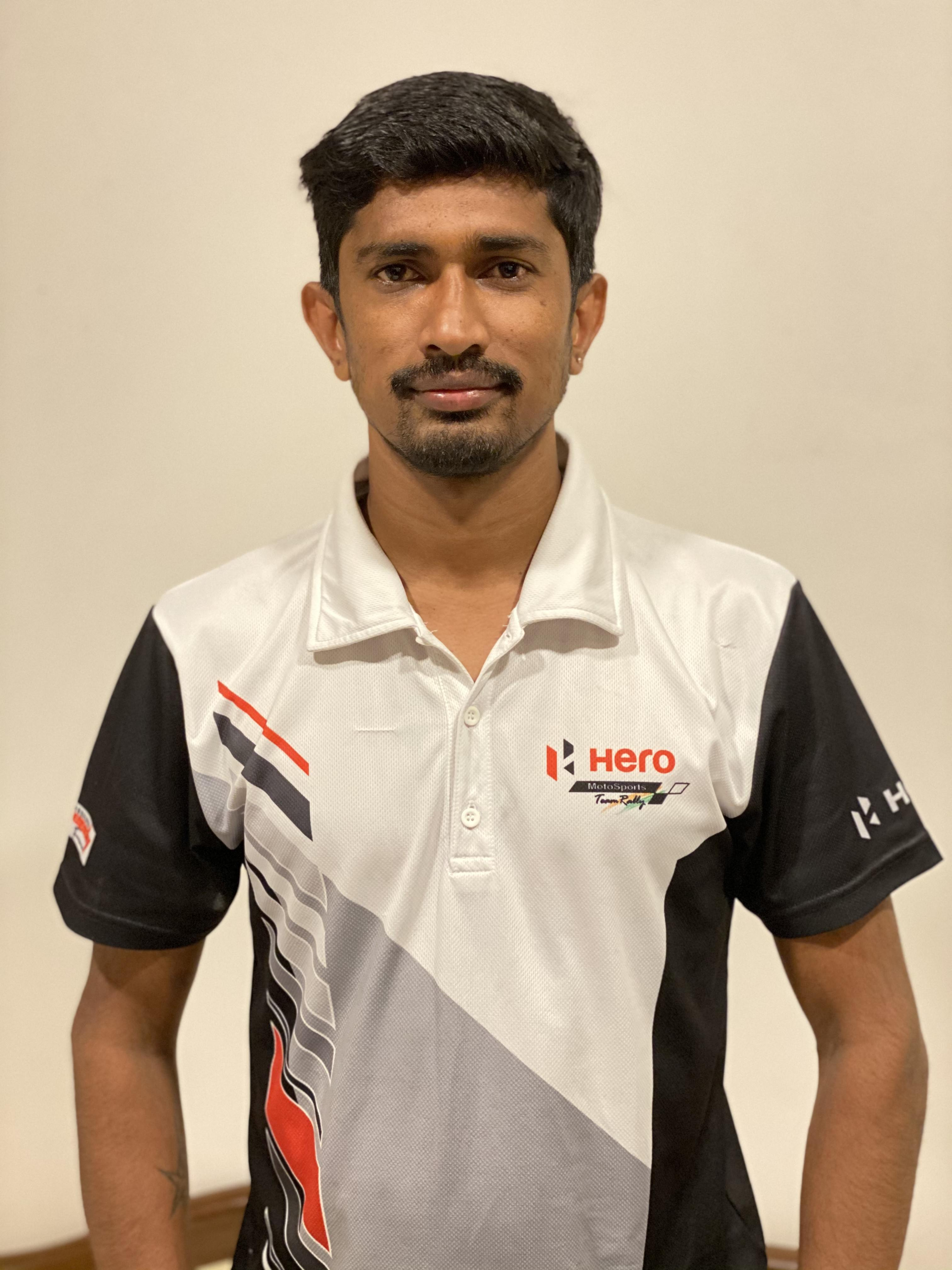
- Years active: 2005-present
- Known for: Rally Racing

Yuva Kumar is an Indian Motorcycle Rally Racer/Pilot. He was born in Chittor, Andhra Pradesh and raised in Bengaluru, Karnataka. He did his schooling and college education in Bangalore and Mysore.

== Career ==
Between 2005 and 2011, he was participating in stunt competitions, Hill Climb races and drag races. He used to be hired as a stunt rider for action sequences in several Kannada movies, short films and Kannada music videos.

During his races, Kumar rode well showing promising skills, and was soon noticed by TVS Racing in 2012 and soon signed up with them under the Novice Category for Supercross and Dirt track racing. With convincing performances as a Rookie, he even started challenging expert riders for the top spot. TVS soon promoted him to the Indian Experts Category 2013 and in 2015, he was selected to participate in Indian National Rally Championship and Indian Cross Country Rallies.

In 2017, Kumar's contract at TVS Racing ended. Between 2017 and 2020, he raced as a privateer with some partial sponsors. In 2021 Hero MotorSports took note of his achievements and officially signed him up as a fully supported and sponsored Factory Rider in their National Team, where he races to this day.

=== Notable achievements ===
Notable achievements in Yuva Kumar's career
Year	Event	Position
2021	Ultimate Desert Challenge	Overall 1st
2020	Sjoba Rally	Overall 2nd
2020	INRSC (Indian National Rally Sprint Championship)	1st Runner up
2020	INRC (Indian National Rally Championship)	2nd Runner up
2019	Red Bull Ace of Dirt	Champion
2019	Indian National Rally Sprint Championship (INRSC)	Championship Winner (165CC)
2019	Maruti Suzuki Desert Storm	1st in Category & 6th in Overall
2018	CEAT Sprint Rally	1st Overall and Fastest Rider
2018	Maruti Suzuki Dakshin Dare	1st in Category & Overall 3rd (260CC)
2018	Maruti Suzuki Desert-Storm	1st in Category & 5th Overall
2017	National Drag Championship	Superbike Wheelie Challenge- First Place
2017	Amby Valley Drag Racing Championship	Fastest Timing in Indian Open Class
2016	Indian National Rally Championship	Runner-Up (260CC)
2015	MRF Supercross Championship	Group C Runner-Up
2015	Maruti Suzuki Raid De Himalayas	3rd in Category & 6th Overall
2015	Indian National Rally Championship	Winner (260CC)
2014	Pirelli K1000 Rally	Runner-Up in Group B
2013	MRF Supercross Championship	Group C (260CC) 2nd Runner-Up
