= Navleen Kumar =

Indian human rights activist

Navleen Kumar was a human rights activist in Maharashtra, India. She was murdered on 19 June 2002 in her apartment building in Mumbai.

== Career ==
Navleen worked for more than a decade to protect and restore the lands of the indigenous Adavasi people in the Thane district through legal intervention. Places in the district, including Nalasopara, Virar and Vasai, experienced rapid suburban expansion from Mumbai. Allegedly, land and property developers were using coercion and intimidation to get land transferred from locals. During the course of her work, Navleen received numerous threats, including one months before her murder.

At approximately 07:30 IST (02:00 UTC) on 19 June, while she was walking her dogs on the terrace of her apartment building, a group of men with knives attacked her. She received 19 stab wounds and died at the scene. One of her dogs sustained knife injuries as it tried to save her. The dog, however, survived.

Her husband, journalist Murali Kumar, was murdered later, reportedly by members of the same group. These killers were never apprehended.

== Aftermath ==
Following her killing, noted civil society members and human rights activists from different parts of India continuously campaigned for justice for Navleen Kumar. They wrote a public letter to then Chief Minister of Maharashtra, Vilasrao Deshmukh, drawing his attention to the killing and demanding justice.

In January 2003, Kumar was posthumously awarded a sum of one hundred thousand Indian rupees (approximately US$2100) by the Public Concern for Governance Trust, an organization that annually confers awards for fighting injustice and exploitation.
