= Deepak Kumar (physicist) =

Indian physicist (1946–2016)

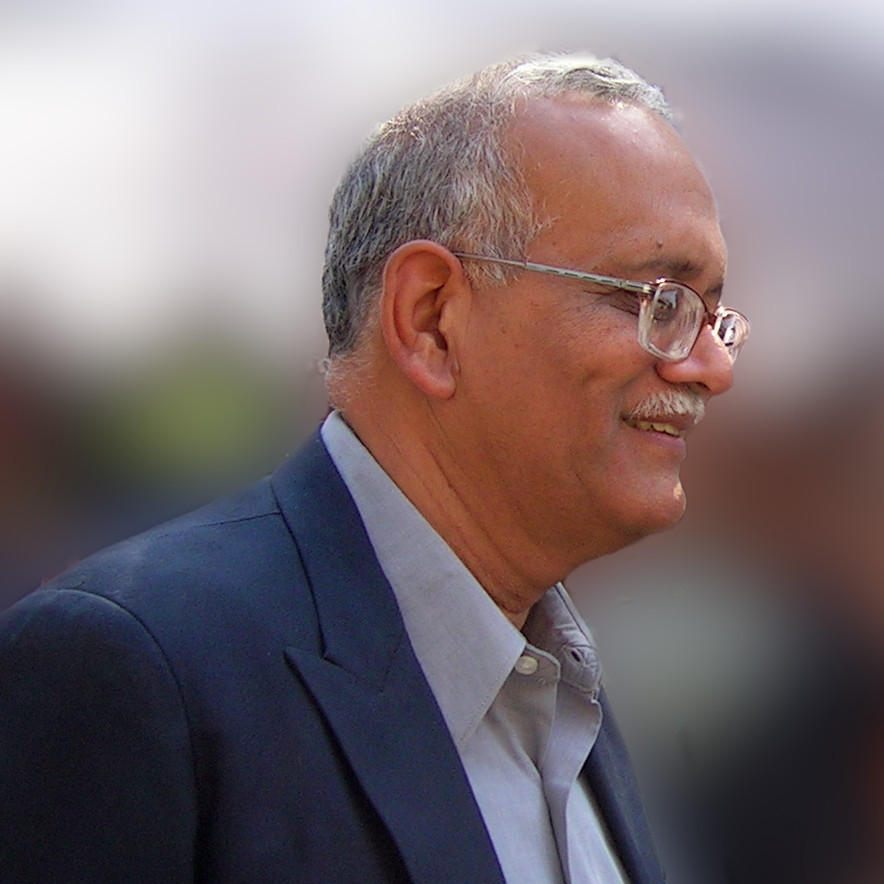
- Deepak Kumar at J.N.U in 2007
- Born: 1 April 1946; New Delhi, India
- Died: 26 January 2016 (aged 69); New Delhi, India
- Education: St. Stephen's College, Delhi; University of Delhi; University of Pennsylvania
- Known for: Studies on theory of disordered magnetic systems
- Awards: 1988 Shanti Swarup Bhatnagar Prize
- Scientific career
- Fields: Condensed matter physics
- Workplaces: IIT Roorkee; Jawaharlal Nehru University
- Doctoral advisor: A. B. Harris

Deepak Kumar (1 April 1946 – 26 January 2016) was an Indian condensed matter physicist and a professor at the School of Physical Sciences of Jawaharlal Nehru University. Known for his research on quantum mechanics and other areas of condensed matter physics, Kumar was an elected fellow of the Indian Academy of Sciences. The Council of Scientific and Industrial Research, the apex agency of the Government of India for scientific research, awarded him the Shanti Swarup Bhatnagar Prize for Science and Technology, one of the highest Indian science awards, for his contributions to physical sciences in 1988. (Note: Long link – please select award year to see details)

== Biography ==
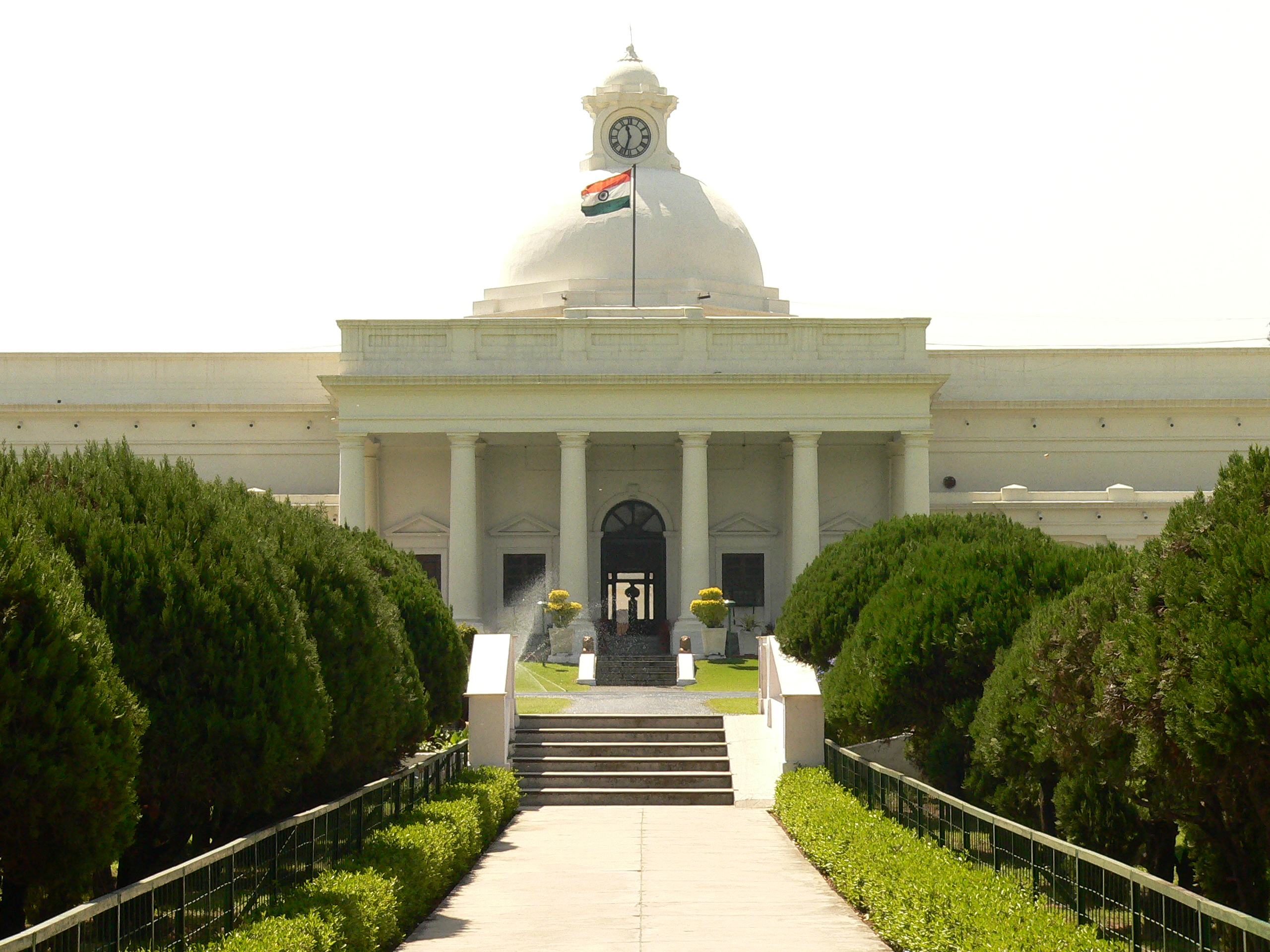
IIT Roorkee

Born to Punjabi Hindu parents on 1 April 1946 in New Delhi, Kumar completed his early schooling at local schools in 1962 before joining St. Stephen's College, Delhi from where he graduated in science with honors in 1965. He continued his studies at the University of Delhi and after earning a master's degree in physics in 1967, he moved to the US to pursue his doctoral studies under the supervision of A. B. Harris at University of Pennsylvania to secure a PhD in 1972. Subsequently, Kumar returned to India to start his career as a member of faculty of the physics department at University of Roorkee (present-day Indian Institute of Technology Roorkee). He served the institution for 16 years and when Jawaharlal Nehru University established a School of Physical Sciences, Kumar returned to his native place to take up the position of a professor at the school in 1988. In between, he had a short spell in Germany as an Alexander von Humboldt Fellow during 1978–79.

Kumar maintained his association with JNU for the rest of his life and it was during his return from the university on 25 January 2016, he fell ill. He died the next day at a local hospital, at the age of 69, survived by son, Sharad, and daughter Jyoti.

== Legacy ==
The main focus of Kumar's research in condensed matter physics was the theory related to disordered magnetic systems. At IIT Roorkee, he collaborated with a number of scientists such as Mustansir Barma and S. Shenoy and studied superparamagnetic particles, magnetic anisotropy and disordered ultrametric models. Kumar's work on the percolation threshold of anisotropic magnets widened the understanding of the fractal nature of spin clusters and was one of the first Indian scientists to estimate the consequences of the clusters near the percolation threshold. Binary liquids, statistical mechanics, phase separation, Stern–Gerlach measurement and Bell's inequality were some of the other areas of his study for which he collaborated with many physicists including Subir Kumar Sarkar, Sanjay Puri, Rupamanjari Ghosh, Ramamurti Rajaraman and A. K. Rastogi. Kumar's studies have been documented by way of a number of articles (Note: Please see Selected bibliography section) and the online article repository of Indian Academy of Sciences has listed 98 of them. Besides, he co-edited two books viz. Proceedings Of The Discussion Meeting On Physics Of Defects with C. N. R. Rao, and Proceedings of the Conference on Quantum Many-Body Physics: From cosmology to superconductivity with S. Puri. Kumar also wrote about the sociological aspects of education and research, contributed chapters to books published by others and his work has drawn citations from others.

== Awards and honors ==
Kumar, an Alexander von Humboldt Fellow, was selected as a senior associate of Abdus Salam International Centre for Theoretical Physics in 1986 and the Indian Academy of Sciences elected him as a fellow in 1987. The Council of Scientific and Industrial Research awarded him the Shanti Swarup Bhatnagar Prize, one of the highest Indian science awards in 1988. Kumar was also associated with Indian Physics Association and Material Research Society of India as a member.

== Selected bibliography ==
- Prabodh Shukla (1982). Physics of Disordered Solids. Mittal Publications. pp. 57–. GGKEY:55XP02JETHQ.
- S. Prakash; K. N. Pathak (1990). Advances in statistical physics of solids and liquids. Wiley. ISBN 978-0-470-21710-8.
- Sumathi Rao (30 May 2002). Field Theories in Condensed Matter Physics. CRC Press. pp. 119–. ISBN 978-0-7503-0876-2.
- Deepak Kumar, Vikram Soni (2000). "Single particle Schrödinger equation with gravitational self-interaction". Physics Letters A. 271 (3): 157–166. Bibcode:2000PhLA..271..157K. doi:10.1016/S0375-9601(00)00361-3.
- Vikas Malik, Deepak Kumar (2003). "Correlated hopping in Coulomb glass". Journal of Physics: Condensed Matter. 15 (32): 5451–5460. Bibcode:2003JPCM...15.5451M. doi:10.1088/0953-8984/15/32/306. S2CID 250780703.
- Sanjay Puri, Deepak KUmar (2004). "Aging and equilibrium fluctuations for domain growth in ternary mixtures". Physical Review Letters. 93 (2) 025701. Bibcode:2004PhRvL..93b5701P. doi:10.1103/PhysRevLett.93.025701. PMID 15323929.

== See also ==
- Order and disorder
- Superparamagnetism
- Bell's theorem
