= Vinay Kumar (academician) =

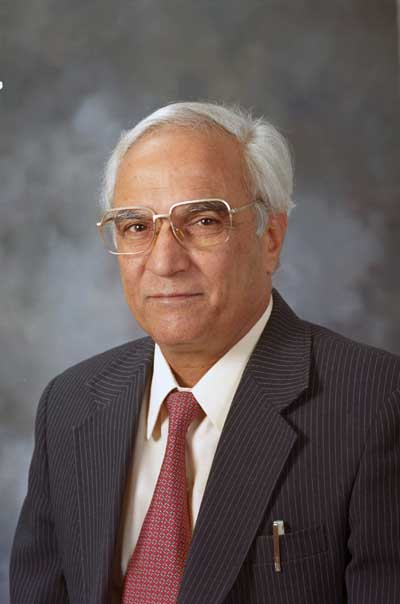
Ch. Vinay Kumar

Vinay Kumar was the vice-chancellor of Chaudhary Charan Singh Haryana Agricultural University (HAU), Hisar, in Haryana, India.

He was associated with the college from its start as a campus college of the Punjab Agricultural University (Ludhiana) in 1948, he rose from the post of an assistant to its Vice-Chancellor. He was also the founding Director General of Jannayak Chaudhary Devilal Vidyapeeth (JCD University), Sirsa, Haryana, India where he established eight colleges and schools.

== Early life ==
Kumar was born on 1 July 1938 at Phoolkan Village in Sirsa District, Haryana. His gotra is Dusad. His father Ch. Kashi Ram was an ordinary farmerkisan. His grandfather, Ch. Kirta Ram was known as Bhagatji (devout) and an expert in natural medicines. For studies, the boy Vinay Kumar was taken by Swami Keshwanand to Grammothan Vidyapeeth, Sangaria (Rajasthan), where he studied up to Matriculation. He passed his B.A. and M.A. (History, Public Administration) privately while employed.

He was married to Smt. Parmeshwari Devi on 30 June 1957. The couple have two sons, Dr. Sudhir Chaudhary (Phoenix, AZ, USA) and Dr. Inderjeet Singh, Director, ICAR-Central Institute for Research on Buffaloes (CIRB) in Hisar, India (till 2018), Director, Animal Husbandry Department, Punjab (2018-2020) and now serving as Vice-Chancellor, Guru Angad Dev Veterinary and Animal Sciences University (GADVASU), Ludhiana (Punjab).

== Career ==
Kumar started his career as an organizing secretary in the Grammothan Vidyapeeth College of Agriculture (Sangaria) on 5 July 1959. Having served there for four years, he joined the Campus College of P.A.U. at Hisar, which later developed into the H.A.U. He was first appointed here as an Assistant in 1963, then as a Superintendent in March 1969, and as an Assistant Registrar in December 1969. He always retained top position in all internal University evaluations. In June 1977, he became the Deputy Registrar, and soon rose to Registrar, HAU, in December 1977. Having served the Campus College PAU and HAU for 36 years, he retired on 30 June 1999 as an Officer on Special Duty (OSD).

After the formation of the INLD Government in Haryana, Vinay Kumar was appointed as the Vice Chancellor (VC) on 4 August 1999. As the VC, he served for four years, and retired at the age of 65. After his retirement from HAU, he was appointed as the Founder Director General of Jannayak Chaudhary Devilal Vidyapeeth (JCD University), Sirsa where he established various colleges, including Engineering, Dental Sciences, Physiotherapy etc. and two schools. After two years, he finally retired from Professional life although he kept helping universities throughout India in matters of Administrative procedures and statutes.

== ALS and death ==
Shortly after coming back from JCD University, Sirsa, Ch. Vinay Kumar was diagnosed with a fatal disease, amyotrophic lateral sclerosis (ALS), a degenerative neuron disease uncommon in this part of the world. He died of the complications from the disease on 8 November 2010.
