= Jeeva Kumar =

Indian kabaddi player

Jeeva Kumar S.
Personal information
- Nationality: (India) Indian
- Born: 1 June 1971 (age 55) Kanyakumari, Tamil Nadu, India
- Occupation: Kabaddi player
- Height: 165 cm (5 ft 5 in)

Sport
- Country: India
- Sport: Kabaddi
- Club: U Mumba; Dabang Delhi KC

Medal record

Men's Kabaddi

Representing India

Asian Games
Gold medal – first place	2010 Guangzhou	

Jeeva Kumar Sivachandraswaran (born 1 June 1971) is representative for India in the sport of Kabaddi. He was a member of the Kabaddi team that won a gold medal in the 2010 Asian Games in Guangzhou.
