= Navin Kumar =

Indian Administrative Service Officer

Chairman Goods and Services Tax Network
- In office March 2013 – August 2017

Chief Secretary Government of Bihar
- In office September 2011 – August 2012

Secretary Ministry of Urban Development
- In office 2010–2011

Chairman Metro Rail Corporation
- In office 2010–2011

Director General Doordarshan
- In office 2004–2006

Personal details
- Born: 29 August 1952 (age 73) Patna, Bihar, India
- Education: B.Sc. M.Sc.
- Alma mater: Patna University
- Occupation: Bureaucrat

Navin Kumar (born 29 August 1952) is a retired Indian Administrative Service (IAS) officer of Bihar cadre in India. He also served as the first chairman of Goods and Services Tax Network (GSTN) in India from 2013 to August 2017. He has also served as Chief Secretary in the state of Bihar retiring from service in August 2012. He belongs to the I.A.S. batch of 1975. He has also served as Secretary in Ministry of Urban Development, Chairman of Metro Rail Corporations of India such as Delhi Metro Rail Corporation, Bangalore Metro Rail Corporation and Director General of Doordarshan with additional charge as CEO of Prasar Bharati.

== Early life and education ==
Kumar joined Indian Administrative Service and began his government service in 1975.

== Career ==
Kumar joined Indian Administrative Service in 1975 and belongs to the Bihar Cadre. In 1977 he was posted as Sub-Divisional Officer of Samastipur. He then went on to serve various districts of Bihar and Jharkhand (erstwhile part of Bihar) as District Magistrate. Between 1988 and 1990 he took central deputation in Ministry of Water Resources as National Coordinator for an engineers' training program. In 1990 he became PS to then Finance Minister Yashwant Sinha under Chandra Shekhar Government. When the government fell in June 1991, he shifted to Department of Economic Affairs under Montek Singh Ahluwalia.

From 1993 to 1996 he was posted as chief technical adviser to a food aid program - funded jointly by the World Food Programme and a Commonwealth institution run by the British Government - in Sierra Leone. After returning from Sierra Leone he was posted in Bihar as head of Bihar State Electricity Board. In 1999, he again went on Central Deputation as Joint Secretary in the Finance Ministry handling external assistance from EC, UK and Canada. He served on this position until 2004 when he was made Director General of Doordarshan. In 2006, he also took additional charge as CEO of Prasar Bharti. In the same year, he was posted back in Bihar, where he served as State Finance Secretary and IT Secretary, setting up e-governance systems linking the Common Service Centers in Panchayats, computerizing treasury operations and setting up a comprehensive public finance management system. In 2010, he joined Ministry of Urban Development as Secretary and was also made Chairman of various Metro Rail Corporations of Indian cities such as Delhi, Bangalore, Kolkata and Chennai.

In September 2011, he returned to Bihar when he was named Chief Secretary of the State. He served on this position until his retirement from Indian Administrative Service in 2012. In March 2013, a selection committee headed by then Finance Minister P. Chidambaram cleared Kumar's name to head Special Purpose Vehicle to handle the Goods and Services Tax Network.

== Goods and Services Tax Network (GSTN) ==
In March 2013, Kumar was selected as chairman of Goods and Services Tax Network by a selection committee. The selection committee, headed by Finance Minister P Chidambaram, chose Kumar from a list of six people, including three more Indian Administrative Services officers and two Indian Revenue Service officers. Along with Finance Minister, the committee consisted of Unique Identification Authority Chairman Nandan Nilekani and Empowered Committee of State Finance Ministers Chairman Sushil Modi.

Goods and Services Tax Network (GSTN) was set up as a Section 8 (under new companies Act, not for profit companies are governed under section 8), Non-Government, Private Limited Company. It was incorporated on March 28, 2013. The Government of India holds 24.5% equity in GSTN and all States of the Indian Union, including NCT of Delhi and Puducherry, and the Empowered Committee of State Finance Ministers (EC), together hold another 24.5%. Balance 51% equity is with non-Government financial institutions. The company was set up primarily to provide IT infrastructure and services to the Central and State Governments, tax payers and other stakeholders for implementation of the Goods and Services Tax (GST). The Authorized Capital of the company is Rs. 100 Million.

The network is expected to process as many as 3.5 billion invoices each month, with the country's 8 million direct taxpayers required to file up to 37 tax returns in a year. The system has the capability to handle nearly 9 million users and up to 120,000 transactions per second.
