= Sushil Kumar (disambiguation) =

Sushil Kumar may refer to:

- Sushil Kumar (biologist) (born 1940), Indian geneticist
- Sushil Kumar (born 1983), Indian wrestler
- Sushil Kumar (admiral) (1940–2019), Indian Chief of Naval Staff
- Acharya Sushil Kumar (1926–1994), Jain evangelist
