= Saurabh Kumar (engineer) =

Indian railway engineer

- Born: 1983
- Died: September 23, 2015 (aged 31–32); Kharagpur, West Bengal, India
- Education: BIT Sindri
- Occupation: Indian Railways officer
- Known for: Whistleblower against corruption in Indian Railways

Saurabh Kumar (1983–2015) was an engineering officer with Indian Railways, hailed as one of several whistleblowers against corruption in India. He died under mysterious circumstances in Kharagpur after informing his family that he had received death threats for resisting pressure to approve tenders.

A graduate of BIT Sindri (2008), Kumar was posted as the purchase officer in Railway stores, handling large-volume tenders for railway scrap. He confided to his friends and family that he was under pressure to approve tenders by "politically affiliated mafia members." On 23 September 2015, his body, already in a state of decomposition, was found at his official quarters in Kharagpur. Reports stated that the body had head injuries and profound bleeding. Initially, the police refused to file a foul play FIR and declared it as a case of death by snakebite.

However, friends formed the group #JusticeForSaurabh on social media. After mounting pressure on the internet, along with TV images showing most of the bedsheet soaked in blood, the railway minister, Suresh Prabhu, ordered a probe, and the police agreed to register an FIR for murder.

The killing is under investigation but the internet outcry continues, pointing to the police reluctance to register the murder as evidence that the investigation was sidetracked at the behest of the rail mafia. In the days after the probe was announced, the group have tried to get political backing for a stricter probe, and a candlelight vigil was organized at Jantar Mantar in New Delhi by the political group, Swaraj Abhiyan, seeking early justice.
